The 2010 Hamilton municipal election was held on October 25, 2010, to select one mayor, fifteen members of the Hamilton, Ontario City Council and members of both English and French public and Catholic school boards. Nominations opened January 4, 2010, and ran until September 10, 2010.

Hamiltonians elected their third mayor in as many elections, choosing former Ward 2 Councillor Bob Bratina over Larry Di Ianni (Mayor 2003–2006) and incumbent mayor Fred Eisenberger, who had served in the role since 2006. The council election to succeed Bratina in Ward 2 drew 20 candidates, while Ward 14 Councillor Robert Patsuta was acclaimed. Only one incumbent councillor was defeated: Brenda Johnstone defeated long-time councillor Dave Mitchell in Ward 11. Many Catholic School Board trustees were defeated by first-time candidates.

New measures
Council backed a measure to elect the boards of Local Health Integration Networks (LHINs), a move that was in response to the LHIN affair, though this did not occur in time for the 2010 Election.

There was speculation that this election was to include a new 16th Council seat, that would encompass southern portions of Wards 6,7 and 8 and the northern portion of Ward 11. The new ward would have included the area to be developed as part of the controversial "Aerotropolis" industrial development plan, though that plan was abandoned in favour of a study of all ward boundaries following the election.

Bill 212, passed by the Ontario Legislature moved municipal elections from the first Monday in November to the fourth Monday in October, shortening the campaign period by two weeks and moving close of nominations to September 10, 2010.

Mayoral election
Eisenberger's upset victory in 2006, his perceived 'weak governing' style in dealing with council and the Pan Am Games Stadium Debate sparked vigorous debate over challengers and led to the largest number of candidates filing to run for the office of mayor in the city's post-amalgamation history.

Candidates

Michael Baldasaro, leader of the Church of the Universe
Bob Bratina, City Councillor for Ward 2 (Downtown)
Mahesh Butani, Developer
Larry Di Ianni, former Mayor of Hamilton
Fred Eisenberger, then Mayor of Hamilton
Pasquale Filice, photographer and lawyer
Edward Graydon, Blogger and Businessman
Andrew Haines, human rights activist
Glenn Hamilton, Businessman and Property Manager
Ken Leach
Tone Marrone, actor and former offensive lineman for the Hamilton Tiger-Cats
Gino Speziale, tool and die maker
Victor Veri, farmer
Steven Waxman, businessman
Mark Wozny

Campaign

Michael Baldasaro was the first candidate to file in early January and was later joined by self-proclaimed marijuana advocate Andrew Haines. Mahesh P. Butani filed his nomination in mid-April and Mayor Fred Eisenberger, having already confirmed he would be seeking a second term in mid-2008, filed on May 31.

Following months of speculation, former Mayor Larry Di Ianni announced he would be standing in the mayoral election in an interview with the Hamilton Spectator on July 26. Perennial joke candidate Marty Zulinak filed soon after, claiming that he would finance his campaign with money from returning used beer bottles. He would later drop out and run for Ward 13 (Dundas) City Councillor.

The Pan Am Games Stadium controversy developed in August. Mayor Eisenberger took the side of the proposed West Harbour location on Hamilton's Waterfront. The ensuing local debate became so passionately heated, Eisenberger began receiving death threats and council, after affirming their support for the West Harbour, reversed their decision and initiated a reevaluation of potential sites. Though the mayor was commended by Toronto's Mayor David Miller and lauded as the week's boldest leader in The Globe and Mail, his handling of the situation caused former New Democratic MP and MPP Ian Deans and Ward 2 (Downtown) Councillor Bob Bratina to announce they would be contesting the election.

Though Deans withdrew from the mayoral race on Thursday, September 9 to run for Ward 2 Councillor, Eisenberger faced fourteen opposing candidates after the close of nominations on September 10, 2010.

On Thursday, October 7, following a debate at Sir John A. Macdonald High School, Edward Graydon unofficially dropped out of the race after fellow contender Andrew Haines told him to "smoke a joint". Graydon was outraged at the comments, and decided to withdraw from the race to support Larry Di Ianni, who came to his defence following Haines' comments. Di Ianni then asserted marijuana advocates should not be attending debates at high schools and school board officials announced they would be reiterating the school's official anti-drug policies the following day. Graydon continued to attend the mayoralty debates, and his name remained on the ballot, as the official withdrawal date had passed by the time he 'withdrew'.

Results

|- 
!rowspan="2" colspan="2" |Candidate
!colspan="3" |Popular vote
|- 
! Votes
! %
! ±%
|-
| style="background-color:#3FFF00;" |
| style="text-align:left;" | Bob Bratina
| style="text-align:right;" |52,684
| style="text-align:right;" |37.32%
| style="text-align:right;" |n/a
|-
| style="background-color:#FF0000;" |
| style="text-align:left;" | Larry Di Ianni
| style="text-align:right;" |40,091
| style="text-align:right;" |28.40%
| style="text-align:right;" |-14.44%
|-
| style="background-color:#66023C;" |
| style="text-align:left;" | Fred Eisenberger (incumbent)
| style="text-align:right;" |38,719
| style="text-align:right;" |27.43%
| style="text-align:right;" |-15.78%
|-
| style="background-color:#69359C;" |
| style="text-align:left;" | Michael Baldasaro
| style="text-align:right;" |2,892
| style="text-align:right;" |2.05%
| style="text-align:right;" |-1.56%
|-
| style="background-color:#9BDDFF"|
| style="text-align:left;" | Tone Marrone
| style="text-align:right;" |1,052
| style="text-align:right;" |0.75%
| style="text-align:right;" |n/a
|-
| style="background-color:#00563F;" |
| style="text-align:left;" | Mahesh Butani
| style="text-align:right;" |950
| style="text-align:right;" |0.67%
| style="text-align:right;" |n/a
|-
| style="background-color:#00BFFF;" |
| style="text-align:left;" | Glenn Hamilton
| style="text-align:right;" |949
| style="text-align:right;" |0.67%
| style="text-align:right;" |n/a
|-
| style="background-color:#E4D00A;" |
| style="text-align:left;" | Pasquale (Pat) Filice
| style="text-align:right;" |768
| style="text-align:right;" |0.54%
| style="text-align:right;" |n/a
|-
| style="background-color:#4F7942;" |
| style="text-align:left;" | Ken Leach
| style="text-align:right;" |577
| style="text-align:right;" |0.41%
| style="text-align:right;" |n/a
|-
| style="background-color:#C19A6B;" |
| style="text-align:left;" | Andrew Haines
| style="text-align:right;" |557
| style="text-align:right;" |0.39%
| style="text-align:right;" |n/a
|-
| style="background-color:#8DB600"|
| style="text-align:left;" | Mark Wozny
| style="text-align:right;" |433
| style="text-align:right;" |0.31%
| style="text-align:right;" |n/a
|-
| style="background-color:#FF9966;" |
| style="text-align:left;" | Steven Waxman
| style="text-align:right;" |429
| style="text-align:right;" |0.30%
| style="text-align:right;" |n/a
|-
| style="background-color:#B2BEB5;" |
| style="text-align:left;" | Edward Graydon 
| style="text-align:right;" |404
| style="text-align:right;" |0.29%
| style="text-align:right;" |n/a
|-
| style="background-color:#5D8AA8;" |
| style="text-align:left;" | Gino Speziale
| style="text-align:right;" |356
| style="text-align:right;" |0.25%
| style="text-align:right;" |-0.77%
|-
| style="background-color:#663854;" |
| style="text-align:left;" | Victor Veri
| style="text-align:right;" |313
| style="text-align:right;" |0.22%
| style="text-align:right;" |n/a
|-
| style="text-align:right;background-color:#FFFFFF;" colspan="2" |Total votes
| style="text-align:right;background-color:#FFFFFF;" |141,174
| style="text-align:right;background-color:#FFFFFF;" |100%
| style="text-align:right;background-color:#FFFFFF;" |
|- 
| style="text-align:right;background-color:#FFFFFF;" colspan="2" |Registered voters
| style="text-align:right;background-color:#FFFFFF;" |353,317
| style="text-align:right;background-color:#FFFFFF;" |40.45%
| style="text-align:right;background-color:#FFFFFF;" |+3.2%
|- 
| style="text-align:left;" colspan="6" |Note: All Hamilton Municipal Elections are officially non-partisan.  Note: Candidate campaign colours are based on the prominent colour used in campaign items (signs, literature, etc.)and are used as a visual differentiation between candidates.
|- 
| style="text-align:left;" colspan="13" |Sources: Hamilton, Ontario, City Clerk's Office
|}

City Council election

Ward One (Chedoke-Cootes)

The campaign for councillor in Ward One focused heavily on the Pan Am Stadium. The West Hamilton Ward was a potential host site for the venue, a fact that incumbent Councillor Brian McHattie passionately opposed. During the election, McHattie ran on a campaign of continuing a push for Light Rail Transit, expanded HSR bus service and improved environmental and anti-poverty projects.

Challenger Raymond Paquette campaigned on a similar platform, with the exception of supporting an increased number of liquor licenses granted to restaurants in Westdale Village, an area popular with McMaster University students.

All three candidates vocally opposed the Pam Am Stadium being placed in Ward One. Each candidate was concerned about the strain such a venue would have on the community surrounding the proposed site, a working CP Rail Yard.

|- 
!rowspan="2" colspan="2" |Candidate
!colspan="3" |Popular vote
|- 
! Votes
! %
! ±%
|-
| style="background-color:#9b0000;" |
| style="text-align:left;" | Brian McHattie (incumbent)
| style="text-align:right;" | 5,373
| style="text-align:right;" | 64.90%
| style="text-align:right;" | +2.02%
|-
| style="background-color:#0000FF;" |
| style="text-align:left;" | Tony Greco
| style="text-align:right;" |2,187
| style="text-align:right;" |26.42%
| style="text-align:right;" | -8.78%
|-
| style="background-color:#C32148;" |
| style="text-align:left;" | Raymond Paquette
| style="text-align:right;" |719
| style="text-align:right;" |8.68%
| style="text-align:right;" | n/a
|-
| style="text-align:right;background-color:#FFFFFF;" colspan="2" |Total votes
| style="text-align:right;background-color:#FFFFFF;" |8279
| style="text-align:right;background-color:#FFFFFF;" |100%
| style="text-align:right;background-color:#FFFFFF;" |
|- 
| style="text-align:right;background-color:#FFFFFF;" colspan="2" |Registered voters
| style="text-align:right;background-color:#FFFFFF;" |20,767
| style="text-align:right;background-color:#FFFFFF;" |40.7%
| style="text-align:right;background-color:#FFFFFF;" |+2.29%
|- 
| style="text-align:left;" colspan="6" |Note: All Hamilton Municipal Elections are officially non-partisan.  Note: Candidate campaign colours are based on the prominent colour used in campaign items (signs, literature, etc.)and are used as a visual differentiation between candidates.
|- 
| style="text-align:left;" colspan="13" |Sources: Hamilton, Ontario, City Clerk's Office
|}

Brian McHattie, councillor since 2003, ran for a third term in Ward One.
Tony Greco is a local barber and stood as a candidate for Ward One Councillor in 2006, garnering 33% in contrast to Councillor McHattie's 63%.
Raymond Paquette is the owner of Ray's Place, a Dundurn Street restaurant.

Ward Two (Downtown)

|- 
!rowspan="2" colspan="2" |Candidate
!colspan="3" |Popular vote
|- 
! Votes
! %
! ±%
|-
| style="background-color:#5F9EA0;" |
| style="text-align:left;" | Jason Farr
| style="text-align:right;" | 1,607
| style="text-align:right;" | 20.97%
| style="text-align:right;" | n/a
|-
| style="background-color:#ff1493;" |
| style="text-align:left;" | Matt Jelly
| style="text-align:right;" |1,434
| style="text-align:right;" |18.72%
| style="text-align:right;" | n/a
|-
| style="background-color:#008B8B;" |
| style="text-align:left;" | Martinus Geleynse
| style="text-align:right;" |805
| style="text-align:right;" |10.51%
| style="text-align:right;" | n/a
|-
| style="background-color:#A1CAF1;" |
| style="text-align:left;" | Erik Hess
| style="text-align:right;" |602
| style="text-align:right;" |7.86%
| style="text-align:right;" | n/a
|-
| style="background-color:#177245;" |
| style="text-align:left;" | Marvin Caplan
| style="text-align:right;" |559
| style="text-align:right;" |7.30%
| style="text-align:right;" | n/a
|-
| style="background-color:#FF7F00;" |
| style="text-align:left;" | James Novak
| style="text-align:right;" |514
| style="text-align:right;" |6.71%
| style="text-align:right;" | n/a
|-
| style="background-color:#A3C1AD;" |
| style="text-align:left;" | Diane Chiarelli
| style="text-align:right;" |403
| style="text-align:right;" |5.26%
| style="text-align:right;" | n/a
|-
| style="background-color:#00008B;" |
| style="text-align:left;" | HooJung Jones
| style="text-align:right;" |312
| style="text-align:right;" |4.07%
| style="text-align:right;" | n/a
|-
| style="background-color:#FF7F00;" |
| style="text-align:left;" | Ian Deans
| style="text-align:right;" |231
| style="text-align:right;" |3.01%
| style="text-align:right;" | n/a
|-
| style="background-color:#FFFF31;" |
| style="text-align:left;" | Shane Coleman
| style="text-align:right;" |217
| style="text-align:right;" |2.83%
| style="text-align:right;" | n/a
|-
| style="background-color:#ED9121;" |
| style="text-align:left;" | Matteo Gentile
| style="text-align:right;" |174
| style="text-align:right;" |2.27%
| style="text-align:right;" | n/a
|-
| style="background-color:#00CED1;" |
| style="text-align:left;" |  Charlie Pipe
| style="text-align:right;" |135
| style="text-align:right;" |1.76%
| style="text-align:right;" | n/a
|-
| style="background-color:#E4D00A;" |
| style="text-align:left;" | Ned Janjic
| style="text-align:right;" |113
| style="text-align:right;" |1.47%
| style="text-align:right;" | n/a
|-
| style="background-color:#BD33A4;" |
| style="text-align:left;" | Lloyd Ferguson
| style="text-align:right;" |102
| style="text-align:right;" |1.33%
| style="text-align:right;" | n/a
|-
| style="background-color:#FF7F00;" |
| style="text-align:left;" | Liban Abdi
| style="text-align:right;" |96
| style="text-align:right;" |1.25%
| style="text-align:right;" | n/a
|-
| style="background-color:#CC0000;" |
| style="text-align:left;" | Kevin Wright
| style="text-align:right;" |91
| style="text-align:right;" |1.19%
| style="text-align:right;" | n/a
|-
| style="background-color:#915C83;" |
| style="text-align:left;" | Paul Casey
| style="text-align:right;" |81
| style="text-align:right;" |1.06%
| style="text-align:right;" | n/a
|-
| style="background-color:#ACE1AF;" |
| style="text-align:left;" | Dawn Lescaudron
| style="text-align:right;" |77
| style="text-align:right;" |1.00%
| style="text-align:right;" | -4.32%
|-
| style="background-color:#36454F;" |
| style="text-align:left;" | Pat Ielasi
| style="text-align:right;" |67
| style="text-align:right;" |0.87%
| style="text-align:right;" | n/a
|-
| style="background-color:#004225;" |
| style="text-align:left;" | John Castle
| style="text-align:right;" |42
| style="text-align:right;" |0.55%
| style="text-align:right;" | n/a
|-
| style="text-align:right;background-color:#FFFFFF;" colspan="2" |Total votes
| style="text-align:right;background-color:#FFFFFF;" |7,662
| style="text-align:right;background-color:#FFFFFF;" |100%
| style="text-align:right;background-color:#FFFFFF;" |
|- 
| style="text-align:right;background-color:#FFFFFF;" colspan="2" |Registered voters
| style="text-align:right;background-color:#FFFFFF;" |19,424
| style="text-align:right;background-color:#FFFFFF;" |40.43%
| style="text-align:right;background-color:#FFFFFF;" |+9.18%
|- 
| style="text-align:left;" colspan="6" |Note: All Hamilton Municipal Elections are officially non-partisan.  Note: Candidate campaign colours are based on the prominent colour used in campaign items (signs, literature, etc.)and are used as a visual differentiation between candidates.
|- 
| style="text-align:left;" colspan="13" |Sources: Hamilton, Ontario, City Clerk's Office
|}

Jason Farr was employed as a host with Cable 14 prior to the election. He was also a volunteer with the Hamilton chapter of the Kiwanis Boys and Girls Club and Camp Maple Leaf/Committed for Kids (BANYAN Community).
Matt Jelly is a local activist and who organizes volunteer activities in the downtown core. He ran for mayor in 2003, finishing seven out of as many candidates.
Martinus Geleynse was a local entrepreneur and the director of the Hamilton24, a large arts festival. Geleynse was also an organizer with the Our City, Our Future campaign, which promoted the proposed West Harbour stadium for the 2015 Pan American Games.
Erik Hess was a professional landscape architect and superintendent of park development for the city of Hamilton. He also served as an independent consultant for the waterfront trust and as a member of the King Street West Business Improvement Area.
Former Ward One Councillor Marvin Caplan, who served from 1994 until 2003, filed to run in Ward Two on September 8.
James Novak had been the Elections Canada Returning Officer for Hamilton Centre and a longtime resident of Hamilton's lower city. After the resignation of Councillor Andrea Horwath, he ran in the 2004 by-election to fill her Ward Two seat.
Diane Chiarelli was a partner with Chiarelli & Noble and the co-founder of United Grandparents of Canada.
HooJung Jones, a Korean-Canadian businesswoman and author, was most notable for her book, Canadians Our Heros, 1950-1953 Korean War. She graduated from McMaster's Commerce program in 1999.
Ian Deans, former New Democratic MP for Hamilton Mountain, filed to run for mayor on September 2, after openly speculating about a return to politics in a mid-2008 interview with the Hamilton Mountain News. He withdrew from the race to run for Ward 2 Councillor on September 7.
Shane Coleman was the son of a stall-holder at the Hamilton Farmer's Market, and had, prior to running, lobbied the city for subsidized parking for market patrons.
Matteo Gentile, a Mohawk College graduate, operated a small restaurant.
Charlie Pipe was a line operator at Procter and Gamble who had graduated from the Dundas Valley School of Art.
Ned Janjic, a graduate of McMaster University's Political Science program, was a property owner and developer in Hamilton since completing his studies.
Lloyd Ferguson
Somali-Canadian Liban Abdi, an employee with Settlement and Integration Services Ontario (SISO), sought election in the downtown ward.
Kevin Wright is a former Officer in the Canadian Forces and has worked with numerous non-profit groups city and province wide.
Paul Casey
Dawn Lescaudron ran in the 2006 election, placing third behind winner Bob Bratina with just over 5% of the vote.
Pat Ielasi
John Castle

Ward Three (East Hamilton)

|- 
!rowspan="2" colspan="2" |Candidate
!colspan="3" |Popular vote
|- 
! Votes
! %
! ±%
|-
| style="background-color:#FF0000;" |
| style="text-align:left;" | Bernie Morelli (incumbent)
| style="text-align:right;" | 3,186
| style="text-align:right;" | 44.66%
| style="text-align:right;" | -27.99%
|-
| style="background-color:#388697;" |
| style="text-align:left;" | Paul Tetley
| style="text-align:right;" | 1,720
| style="text-align:right;" | 24.11%
| style="text-align:right;" | n/a
|-
| style="background-color:#FCC200;" |
| style="text-align:left;" | Sean Gibson
| style="text-align:right;" | 976
| style="text-align:right;" | 13.68%
| style="text-align:right;" | -13.67%
|-
| style="background-color:#FF0000;" |
| style="text-align:left;" | Mark DiMillo
| style="text-align:right;" | 723
| style="text-align:right;" | 10.13%
| style="text-align:right;" | n/a
|-
| style="background-color:#FFE882;" |
| style="text-align:left;" | Bob Black
| style="text-align:right;" | 373
| style="text-align:right;" | 5.23%
| style="text-align:right;" | n/a
|-
| style="background-color:#FF7F00;" |
| style="text-align:left;" | Wilamina McGrimmond
| style="text-align:right;" | 156
| style="text-align:right;" | 2.19%
| style="text-align:right;" | n/a
|-
| style="text-align:right;background-color:#FFFFFF;" colspan="2" |Total votes
| style="text-align:right;background-color:#FFFFFF;" |7,329
| style="text-align:right;background-color:#FFFFFF;" |100%
| style="text-align:right;background-color:#FFFFFF;" |
|- 
| style="text-align:right;background-color:#FFFFFF;" colspan="2" |Registered voters
| style="text-align:right;background-color:#FFFFFF;" |23,670
| style="text-align:right;background-color:#FFFFFF;" |31.0%
| style="text-align:right;background-color:#FFFFFF;" |+4.37%
|- 
| style="text-align:left;" colspan="6" |Note: All Hamilton Municipal Elections are officially non-partisan.  Note: Candidate campaign colours are based on the prominent colour used in campaign items (signs, literature, etc.)and are used as a visual differentiation between candidates.
|- 
| style="text-align:left;" colspan="13" |Sources: Hamilton, Ontario, City Clerk's Office , 2006 City of Hamilton Municipal Election Site, 2010 City of Hamilton Municipal Election Site
|}

Bob Black works with the Hamilton Area Labour Council.
Mark DiMillo ran in Ward 7 in the 2006 Election, capturing 1,179 votes (8.48%), finishing fifth in the election won by incumbent Scott Duvall.
Sean Gibson ran in the 2006 Election, gaining 27% to incumbent councillor Bernie Morelli's 73%.
Wilamina McGrimmond is a native rights activist, and sought the provincial New Democratic Party nomination for Hamilton East-Stoney Creek in the 2007 Provincial Election.
Longtime incumbent councillor Bernie Morelli has filed for re-election, despite rumours that he would not stand in 2010.
Paul Tetley is a Ward 3 homeowner and a businessman, whose campaign slogan is "Get Ready for Change" and focus is on "Vision, Leadership and Change".

Ward Four (East Hamilton)

|- 
!rowspan="2" colspan="2" |Candidate
!colspan="3" |Popular vote
|- 
! Votes
! %
! ±%
|-
| style="background-color:#FF7F00;" |
| style="text-align:left;" | Sam Merulla (incumbent)
| style="text-align:right;" |6,787
| style="text-align:right;" |82.41%
| style="text-align:right;" |+19.37
|-
| style="background-color:#8B0000;" |
| style="text-align:left;" | Norm Bulbrook
| style="text-align:right;" |743
| style="text-align:right;" |9.02%
| style="text-align:right;" |+4.39
|-
| style="background-color:#002E63;" |
| style="text-align:left;" | Giulio Cicconi
| style="text-align:right;" |706	
| style="text-align:right;" |8.57%
| style="text-align:right;" |n/a
|-
| style="text-align:right;background-color:#FFFFFF;" colspan="2" |Total votes
| style="text-align:right;background-color:#FFFFFF;" |8,420
| style="text-align:right;background-color:#FFFFFF;" |100%
| style="text-align:right;background-color:#FFFFFF;" |
|- 
| style="text-align:right;background-color:#FFFFFF;" colspan="2" |Registered voters
| style="text-align:right;background-color:#FFFFFF;" |23,721
| style="text-align:right;background-color:#FFFFFF;" |35.5%
| style="text-align:right;background-color:#FFFFFF;" |+1.02%
|- 
| style="text-align:left;" colspan="6" |Note: All Hamilton Municipal Elections are officially non-partisan.  Note: Candidate campaign colours are based on the prominent colour used in campaign items (signs, literature, etc.)and are used as a visual differentiation between candidates.
|- 
| style="text-align:left;" colspan="13" |Sources: Hamilton, Ontario, City Clerk's Office 
|}

Norm Bulbrook ran in the 2006 election and placed 3rd, with 4.63% of the vote.
Giulio Cicconi is the treasurer of the United Steelworkers Local 8782 at U.S. Steel's Nanticoke Plant.
Sam Merulla is the ward's two-term incumbent councillor, with close affiliations with the New Democrats. In 2006, he collected 5005 votes and won over closest challenger Dave Wilson.

Ward Five (Redhill)

|- 
!rowspan="2" colspan="2" |Candidate
!colspan="3" |Popular vote
|- 
! Votes
! %
! ±%
|-
| style="background-color:#FF0000;" |
| style="text-align:left;" | Chad Collins (incumbent)
| style="text-align:right;" | 6,876	
| style="text-align:right;" | 66.92%
| style="text-align:right;" | -23.34%
|-
| style="background-color:#003399;" |
| style="text-align:left;" | Frank Rukavina
| style="text-align:right;" |1,512	
| style="text-align:right;" |14.72%
| style="text-align:right;" |n/a
|-
| style="background-color:#FFA700;" |
| style="text-align:left;" | Jaswinder Bedi
| style="text-align:right;" |1,220	
| style="text-align:right;" | 11.87%
| style="text-align:right;" |n/a
|-
| style="background-color:#85BB65;" |
| style="text-align:left;" | Dave Stacey
| style="text-align:right;" |667	
| style="text-align:right;" |6.49%
| style="text-align:right;" |n/a
|-
| style="text-align:right;background-color:#FFFFFF;" colspan="2" |Total votes
| style="text-align:right;background-color:#FFFFFF;" |10,642
| style="text-align:right;background-color:#FFFFFF;" |100%
| style="text-align:right;background-color:#FFFFFF;" |
|- 
| style="text-align:right;background-color:#FFFFFF;" colspan="2" |Registered voters
| style="text-align:right;background-color:#FFFFFF;" |25,755
| style="text-align:right;background-color:#FFFFFF;" |41.3%
| style="text-align:right;background-color:#FFFFFF;" |+3.43%
|- 
| style="text-align:left;" colspan="6" |Note: All Hamilton Municipal Elections are officially non-partisan.  Note: Candidate campaign colours are based on the prominent colour used in campaign items (signs, literature, etc.)and are used as a visual differentiation between candidates.
|- 
| style="text-align:left;" colspan="6" |Sources: Hamilton, Ontario, City Clerk's Office 
|}

Jaswinder Bedi was a representative of the Ontario Taxiworkers Union.
Incumbent councillor Chad Collins, who had served on Hamilton City Council since 1994, sought re-election in his east Hamilton ward.
Frank Rukavina was the Conservative candidate in Hamilton East-Stoney Creek in the 2008 Federal election.
Dave Stacey filed on the last day of nominations, September 10.

Ward Six (East Mountain)

|- 
!rowspan="2" colspan="2" |Candidate
!colspan="3" |Popular vote
|- 
! Votes
! %
! ±%
|-
| style="background-color:#002E63;" |
| style="text-align:left;" | Tom Jackson (incumbent)
| style="text-align:right;" |6,560
| style="text-align:right;" |54.90%
| style="text-align:right;" |-24.8%
|-
| style="background-color:#318CE7;" |
| style="text-align:left;" | Chris Behrens
| style="text-align:right;" |1,693
| style="text-align:right;" |14.17%
| style="text-align:right;" |n/a
|-
| style="background-color:#8A3324;" |
| style="text-align:left;" | Michelle Febers
| style="text-align:right;" |1,510
| style="text-align:right;" |12.64%
| style="text-align:right;" |n/a
|-
| style="background-color:#00FF00;" |
| style="text-align:left;" | Ed Pecyna
| style="text-align:right;" |1,127	
| style="text-align:right;" |9.43%
| style="text-align:right;" |n/a
|-
| style="background-color:#E30022;" |
| style="text-align:left;" | Nathalie Xian Yi Yan
| style="text-align:right;" |862
| style="text-align:right;" |7.21%
| style="text-align:right;" |-13.09%
|-
| style="background-color:#CC00CC;" |
| style="text-align:left;" | Steven Knowles
| style="text-align:right;" |198
| style="text-align:right;" |1.66%
| style="text-align:right;" |n/a
|-
| style="text-align:right;background-color:#FFFFFF;" colspan="2" |Total votes
| style="text-align:right;background-color:#FFFFFF;" |12,190
| style="text-align:right;background-color:#FFFFFF;" |100%
| style="text-align:right;background-color:#FFFFFF;" |
|- 
| style="text-align:right;background-color:#FFFFFF;" colspan="2" |Registered voters
| style="text-align:right;background-color:#FFFFFF;" |28,266
| style="text-align:right;background-color:#FFFFFF;" |43.1%
| style="text-align:right;background-color:#FFFFFF;" |+3.72%
|- 
| style="text-align:left;" colspan="6" |Note: All Hamilton Municipal Elections are officially non-partisan.  Note: Candidate campaign colours are based on the prominent colour used in campaign items (signs, literature, etc.)and are used as a visual differentiation between candidates.
|- 
| style="text-align:left;" colspan="6" |Sources: Hamilton, Ontario, City Clerk's Office 
|}

Chris Behrens, who filed on July 27, was a high school Automotive and Transportation technology teacher.
Michelle Febers was the co-chair of the Hamilton Make It Seven Day rally, an event in support of RIM CEO Jim Balsillie's attempt to relocate the Phoenix Coyotes to Hamilton.
22-year council veteran Tom Jackson sought another term in Ward 6. Jackson was, at the time, the longest serving member of council, having completed seven terms as Ward 6's representative.
Challenger Steven Knowles stepped up on August 18.
Ed Pecyna was the St. Margaret Mary Catholic Elementary School Council President.
Nathalie Xian Yi Yan decided to run in Ward 6 again, after receiving 2,160 votes and losing to councillor Tom Jackson in the 2006 Election.

Ward Seven (Central Mountain)

|- 
!rowspan="2" colspan="2" |Candidate
!colspan="3" |Popular vote
|- 
! Votes
! %
! ±%
|-
| style="background-color:#FF7F00;" |
| style="text-align:left;" | Scott Duvall (incumbent)
| style="text-align:right;" |9,027	
| style="text-align:right;" |57.61%
| style="text-align:right;" |+28.05%
|-
| style="background-color:#0047AB;" |
| style="text-align:left;" | Trevor Pettit
| style="text-align:right;" |3,938	
| style="text-align:right;" |25.13%
| style="text-align:right;" |n/a
 |-
| style="background-color:#FF003F;" |
| style="text-align:left;" | John Gallagher
| style="text-align:right;" |1,899	
| style="text-align:right;" |12.12%
| style="text-align:right;" |+2.91%
|-
| style="background-color:#aaf442;" |
| style="text-align:left;" | Keith Beck
| style="text-align:right;" |805	
| style="text-align:right;" |5.14%
| style="text-align:right;" |n/a
|-
| style="text-align:right;background-color:#FFFFFF;" colspan="2" |Total votes
| style="text-align:right;background-color:#FFFFFF;" |16,173
| style="text-align:right;background-color:#FFFFFF;" |100%
| style="text-align:right;background-color:#FFFFFF;" |
|- 
| style="text-align:right;background-color:#FFFFFF;" colspan="2" |Registered voters
| style="text-align:right;background-color:#FFFFFF;" |40,571
| style="text-align:right;background-color:#FFFFFF;" |39.9 %
| style="text-align:right;background-color:#FFFFFF;" |+2.97%
|- 
| style="text-align:left;" colspan="6" |Note: All Hamilton Municipal Elections are officially non-partisan.  Note: Candidate campaign colours are based on the prominent colour used in campaign items (signs, literature, etc.)and are used as a visual differentiation between candidates.
|- 
| style="text-align:left;" colspan="13" |Sources: Hamilton, Ontario, City Clerk's Office 
|}

Keith Beck had filed to run in Ward Two earlier in the year, but dropped out of the race on August 4. Previously, he had received 507 votes in the 2006 Election, though as a candidate for Ward 10 and, prior to the close of nominations that year, he had filed papers to run for mayor, but withdrew from that race to pursue a councillor's position.
 First-term Councillor Scott Duvall announced that he would be seeking a second term in the Mountain News on January 1, 2010. He officially filed to run in Ward 7 again on the first day nominations opened, January 4.
John Gallagher also stood in the 2006 election for the position of Ward Seven Councillor, placing fourth with 9.21% of the vote.
Trevor Pettit, who filed on September 2, was the former Progressive Conservative MPP for Hamilton Mountain.

Ward Eight (West Mountain)

Ward Eight's council race was marked by the unofficial withdrawal of two candidates, namely Jeff Bonner for personal reasons and Bruce Whitelaw in support of incumbent Councillor Terry Whitehead's campaign.

Whitehead's last campaigning opponent, Kim Jenkinson, wrote a post-election reflection for The Hamilton Spectator, where she outlined her reasons for running and the process by which she campaigned. In the article, she noted, "I've had my say, I've played fair, and I have met some interesting people, and had my family and friends at my back the whole way."

|- 
!rowspan="2" colspan="2" |Candidate
!colspan="3" |Popular vote
|- 
! Votes
! %
! ±%
|-
| style="background-color:#FF0800;" |
| style="text-align:left;" | Terry Whitehead (incumbent)
| style="text-align:right;" | 9,908
| style="text-align:right;" | 67.37%
| style="text-align:right;" | +11.65%
|-
| style="background-color:#0047AB;" |
| style="text-align:left;" | Kim Jenkinson
| style="text-align:right;" | 3,877
| style="text-align:right;" | 26.36%
| style="text-align:right;" | n/a
|-
| style="background-color:#FF7E00;" |
| style="text-align:left;" | Bruce Whitelaw
| style="text-align:right;" | 471
| style="text-align:right;" | 3.20%
| style="text-align:right;" | n/a
|-
| style="background-color:#B2BEB5;" |
| style="text-align:left;" | Jeff Bonner 
| style="text-align:right;" | 451
| style="text-align:right;" | 3.07%
| style="text-align:right;" | n/a
|-
| style="text-align:right;background-color:#FFFFFF;" colspan="2" |Total votes
| style="text-align:right;background-color:#FFFFFF;" |15,135
| style="text-align:right;background-color:#FFFFFF;" |100%
| style="text-align:right;background-color:#FFFFFF;" |
|- 
| style="text-align:right;background-color:#FFFFFF;" colspan="2" |Registered voters
| style="text-align:right;background-color:#FFFFFF;" |34,259
| style="text-align:right;background-color:#FFFFFF;" |44.2%
| style="text-align:right;background-color:#FFFFFF;" |+1.19%
|- 
| style="text-align:left;" colspan="6" |Note: All Hamilton Municipal Elections are officially non-partisan.  Note: Candidate campaign colours are based on the prominent colour used in campaign items (signs, literature, etc.)and are used as a visual differentiation between candidates.
|- 
| style="text-align:left;" colspan="13" |Sources: Hamilton, Ontario, City Clerk's Office , Hamilton Election Results
|}

Realtor and Mohawk College alumnus Jeff Bonner filed to run for council on July 8. On Sept. 23, Bonner announced he would be ceasing all campaign activities thanks to issues of a "personal nature".
Kim Jenkinson, BA, CGA is currently the controller for a children's charity. Jenkinson ran what she called a 'back to basics' campaign, highlighting a platform of accountability and action.
Incumbent Councillor Terry Whitehead filed for re-election on July 21, 2010.
A  pipe fitter on disability, Bruce Whitelaw focused on senior care, saying that it was an issue that, "lit my fire.... We’re not maintaining their dignity."  On October 15, 2010, Whitelaw announced that would step down from the campaign and throw his support behind incumbent Terry Whitehead.

Ward Nine (Heritage Stoney Creek)

|- 
!rowspan="2" colspan="2" |Candidate
!colspan="3" |Popular vote
|- 
! Votes
! %
! ±%
|-
| style="background-color:#0047AB;" |
| style="text-align:left;" | Brad Clark (incumbent)
| style="text-align:right;" |3,454
| style="text-align:right;" |45.33%
| style="text-align:right;" |-5.59
|-
| style="background-color:#00008B;" |
| style="text-align:left;" | Nancy Fiorentino
| style="text-align:right;" |2,343	
| style="text-align:right;" |30.75%
| style="text-align:right;" |n/a
|-
| style="background-color:#FF7E00;" |
| style="text-align:left;" | Geraldine McMullen
| style="text-align:right;" |999	
| style="text-align:right;" |13.11%
| style="text-align:right;" |n/a
|-
| style="background-color:#004225;" |
| style="text-align:left;" | Andrew Mowatt
| style="text-align:right;" |824	
| style="text-align:right;" |10.81%
| style="text-align:right;" |n/a
|-
| style="text-align:right;background-color:#FFFFFF;" colspan="2" |Total votes
| style="text-align:right;background-color:#FFFFFF;" |7743
| style="text-align:right;background-color:#FFFFFF;" |100%
| style="text-align:right;background-color:#FFFFFF;" |
|- 
| style="text-align:right;background-color:#FFFFFF;" colspan="2" |Registered voters
| style="text-align:right;background-color:#FFFFFF;" |19,235
| style="text-align:right;background-color:#FFFFFF;" |40.3%
| style="text-align:right;background-color:#FFFFFF;" |+3.16%
|- 
| style="text-align:left;" colspan="6" |Note: All Hamilton Municipal Elections are officially non-partisan.  Note: Candidate campaign colours are based on the prominent colour used in campaign items (signs, literature, etc.)and are used as a visual differentiation between candidates.
|- 
| style="text-align:left;" colspan="13" |Sources: Hamilton, Ontario, City Clerk's Office 
|}

Brad Clark, the first-term incumbent councillor, sought a second term.
Nancy Fiorentino was a local resident who worked for the Town of Oakville.
Geraldine McMullen was a representative with Canadian Office and Professional Employees Union, Local 343.
Former Olympian and police officer, Andrew Mowatt ran for the first time.

Ward Ten (Stoney Creek)

|- 
!rowspan="2" colspan="2" |Candidate
!colspan="3" |Popular vote
|- 
! Votes
! %
! ±%
|-
| style="background-color:#ED1C24;" |
| style="text-align:left;" | Maria Pearson (incumbent)
| style="text-align:right;" |5,464
| style="text-align:right;" |63.85%
| style="text-align:right;" |-11.22%
|-
| style="background-color:#0892D0;" |
| style="text-align:left;" | Bernard Josipovic
| style="text-align:right;" |1,995	
| style="text-align:right;" |23.31%
| style="text-align:right;" |n/a
|-
| style="background-color:#A40000;" |
| style="text-align:left;" |  Jose Pablo Bustamante
| style="text-align:right;" |1,098	
| style="text-align:right;" |12.83%
| style="text-align:right;" |n/a
|-
| style="text-align:right;background-color:#FFFFFF;" colspan="2" |Total votes
| style="text-align:right;background-color:#FFFFFF;" |8,772
| style="text-align:right;background-color:#FFFFFF;" |100%
| style="text-align:right;background-color:#FFFFFF;" |
|- 
| style="text-align:right;background-color:#FFFFFF;" colspan="2" |Registered voters
| style="text-align:right;background-color:#FFFFFF;" |19,350
| style="text-align:right;background-color:#FFFFFF;" |45.33%
| style="text-align:right;background-color:#FFFFFF;" |+4.01%
|- 
| style="text-align:left;" colspan="6" |Note: All Hamilton Municipal Elections are officially non-partisan.  Note: Candidate campaign colours are based on the prominent colour used in campaign items (signs, literature, etc.)and are used as a visual differentiation between candidates.
|- 
| style="text-align:left;" colspan="13" |Sources: Hamilton, Ontario, City Clerk's Office 
|}

 IT entrepreneur Jose Pablo Bustamante filed papers to run in Ward 10, saying "New people need to come to city council and new ideas have to flow."
 Bernard Josipovic, a former employee for local radio station Y108, as well as both of Hamilton's steel manufacturers, Stelco and Dofasco, filed on June 3.
 Maria Pearson, two term Ward 10 councillor is seeking a third mandate.

Ward Eleven (Glanbrook-Winona)

|- 
!rowspan="2" colspan="2" |Candidate
!colspan="3" |Popular vote
|- 
! Votes
! %
! ±%
|-
| style="background-color:#66B032;" |
| style="text-align:left;" | Brenda Johnson
| style="text-align:right;" |4,410
| style="text-align:right;" |42.12%
| style="text-align:right;" |n/a
|-
| style="background-color:#FAF0BE;" |
| style="text-align:left;" | David Mitchell (incumbent)
| style="text-align:right;" |4,165	
| style="text-align:right;" |39.78%
| style="text-align:right;" |-20.26%
|-
| style="background-color:#FFD12A;" |
| style="text-align:left;" |  Ken Chartrand
| style="text-align:right;" |1,896	
| style="text-align:right;" |18.11%
| style="text-align:right;" |n/a
|-
| style="text-align:right;background-color:#FFFFFF;" colspan="2" |Total votes
| style="text-align:right;background-color:#FFFFFF;" |10,676
| style="text-align:right;background-color:#FFFFFF;" |100%
| style="text-align:right;background-color:#FFFFFF;" |
|- 
| style="text-align:right;background-color:#FFFFFF;" colspan="2" |Registered voters
| style="text-align:right;background-color:#FFFFFF;" |24,655
| style="text-align:right;background-color:#FFFFFF;" |43.30%
| style="text-align:right;background-color:#FFFFFF;" |+3.04%
|- 
| style="text-align:left;" colspan="6" |Note: All Hamilton Municipal Elections are officially non-partisan.  Note: Candidate campaign colours are based on the prominent colour used in campaign items (signs, literature, etc.)and are used as a visual differentiation between candidates.
|- 
| style="text-align:left;" colspan="13" |Sources: Hamilton, Ontario, City Clerk's Office 
|}

 Ken Chartrand was a first time candidate, who said in an interview with The Hamiltonian, "It is time for a new representative with a strong ear who listens and has vast knowledge of all the communities and will represent all the people."
Brenda Johnson, a Winona resident and member of Environment Hamilton notable for her activism in persuading the city to avoid a Wal-Mart power centre development in her town, stood for the first time.
Controversial councillor Dave Mitchell sought another term on city council in the wake of his censure by his peers in 2008.

Ward Twelve (Ancaster)

|- 
!rowspan="2" colspan="2" |Candidate
!colspan="3" |Popular vote
|- 
! Votes
! %
! ±%
|-
| style="background-color:#C32148;" |
| style="text-align:left;" | Lloyd Ferguson (incumbent)
| style="text-align:right;" |7,447	
| style="text-align:right;" |73.28%
| style="text-align:right;" |+31.89%
|-
| style="background-color:#FE6F5E;" |
| style="text-align:left;" | Brenda Cox-Graham
| style="text-align:right;" |2,716	
| style="text-align:right;" |26.72%
| style="text-align:right;" |n/a
|-
| style="text-align:right;background-color:#FFFFFF;" colspan="2" |Total votes
| style="text-align:right;background-color:#FFFFFF;" |8279
| style="text-align:right;background-color:#FFFFFF;" |100%
| style="text-align:right;background-color:#FFFFFF;" |
|- 
| style="text-align:right;background-color:#FFFFFF;" colspan="2" |Registered voters
| style="text-align:right;background-color:#FFFFFF;" |20,767
| style="text-align:right;background-color:#FFFFFF;" |40.7%
| style="text-align:right;background-color:#FFFFFF;" |+2.29%
|- 
| style="text-align:left;" colspan="6" |Note: All Hamilton Municipal Elections are officially non-partisan.  Note: Candidate campaign colours are based on the prominent colour used in campaign items (signs, literature, etc.)and are used as a visual differentiation between candidates.
|- 
| style="text-align:left;" colspan="13" |Sources: Hamilton, Ontario, City Clerk's Office 
|}

Brenda Cox-Graham is an Ancaster based lawyer, who has contributed to major international legal journals.
Ancaster councillor Lloyd Ferguson, despite considering a mayoral run, has decided to run for a second term.

Ward Thirteen (Dundas)

Russ Powers, the incumbent councillor and former Liberal MP for Ancaster—Dundas—Flamborough—Westdale, sought another term on council. Aside from a two-year period, Powers had served in local elected office since 1982. Powers' message during the campaign and to local media was simple, though light on policy specifics. When asked about his platform, Powers indicated he was running "To continue to represent the citizens of the community of Dundas to the best of my ability."

Danya Scime, a vocal opponent of the West Harbour Pan Am Games Stadium site, filed to run against Powers on September 8. Scime's campaign focused on growing Dundas' commercial tax base through redeveloping brownfields, protecting greenspace, and improving the city's regulatory process to make by-laws and permits more simple. Ron Tammer was a member of the community active with Dundas Minor Hockey Association and Dundas Minor Baseball Association, as well as working with advocacy groups like the Hamilton Youth Justice Committee and Friends of the Red Hill Valley. Tammer's campaign focused on addressing issues of poverty and more responsible development to protect ecologically-sensitive areas. Glenn Robinson, a life-long Dundas resident, campaigned on broadening the scope of community consultation.

Perennial candidate Marty Zulniak dropped out of the mayoral contest to run against Powers in Ward 13. Zulniak, a Dundas native and local "colourful character", campaigned on a localist platform of supporting the community, telling The Spectator "infrastructure in this community isn't what it was in the good ole days," and pushing to clean up Spencer Creek.

|- 
!rowspan="2" colspan="2" |Candidate
!colspan="3" |Popular vote
|- 
! Votes
! %
! ±%
|-
| style="background-color:#CC0000;" |
| style="text-align:left;" | Russ Powers (incumbent)
| style="text-align:right;" |4,884
| style="text-align:right;" |58.92%
| style="text-align:right;" |+24.59%
|-
| style="background-color:#00009C;" |
| style="text-align:left;" | Danya Scime
| style="text-align:right;" |1,761	
| style="text-align:right;" |21.25%
| style="text-align:right;" |-
|-
| style="background-color:#B57EDC;" |
| style="text-align:left;" | Glenn Robinson
| style="text-align:right;" |758	
| style="text-align:right;" |9.14%
| style="text-align:right;" |-
|-
| style="background-color:#00A86B;" |
| style="text-align:left;" | Ron Tammer
| style="text-align:right;" |559	
| style="text-align:right;" |6.74%
| style="text-align:right;" |-
|-
| style="background-color:#FCF75E;" |
| style="text-align:left;" | Marty Zulniak
| style="text-align:right;" |327	
| style="text-align:right;" |3.94%
| style="text-align:right;" |-
|-
| style="text-align:right;background-color:#FFFFFF;" colspan="2" |Total votes
| style="text-align:right;background-color:#FFFFFF;" |8,450
| style="text-align:right;background-color:#FFFFFF;" |100%
| style="text-align:right;background-color:#FFFFFF;" |
|- 
| style="text-align:right;background-color:#FFFFFF;" colspan="2" |Registered voters
| style="text-align:right;background-color:#FFFFFF;" |18,439
| style="text-align:right;background-color:#FFFFFF;" |45.83%
| style="text-align:right;background-color:#FFFFFF;" |+2.39%
|- 
| style="text-align:left;" colspan="6" |Note: All Hamilton Municipal Elections are officially non-partisan.  Note: Candidate campaign colours are based on the prominent colour used in campaign items (signs, literature, etc.)and are used as a visual differentiation between candidates.
|- 
| style="text-align:left;" colspan="13" |Sources: 
|}

Ward Fourteen (Jerseyville-Rockton)

|- 
!rowspan="2" colspan="2" |Candidate
!colspan="3" |Popular vote
|- 
! Votes
! %
! ±%
|-
| style="background-color:#FFBF00;" |
| style="text-align:left;" | Robert Pasuta (incumbent)
!colspan="3" style="text-align:center;" | Acclaimed
|-
| style="text-align:right;background-color:#FFFFFF;" colspan="2" |Total votes
| style="text-align:right;background-color:#FFFFFF;" |4,264
| style="text-align:right;background-color:#FFFFFF;" |100%
| style="text-align:right;background-color:#FFFFFF;" |
|- 
| style="text-align:right;background-color:#FFFFFF;" colspan="2" |Registered voters
| style="text-align:right;background-color:#FFFFFF;" |12,147
| style="text-align:right;background-color:#FFFFFF;" |35.10%
| style="text-align:right;background-color:#FFFFFF;" |-1.49%
|- 
| style="text-align:left;" colspan="6" |Note: For this election, voter-turnout is just for the position of Mayor and Catholic School Board Trustee in that both  Councillor and Public School Board Trustee were acclaimed.  Note: All Hamilton Municipal Elections are officially non-partisan.  Note: Candidate campaign colours are based on the prominent colour used in campaign items (signs, literature, etc.)and are used as a visual differentiation between candidates.
|- 
| style="text-align:left;" colspan="13" |Sources: Hamilton, Ontario, City Clerk's Office 
|}

First-term incumbent councillor Robert Pasuta was acclaimed to a second term when no candidates challenged him by the close of nominations on September 10, 2010.

Ward Fifteen (Flamborough)

|- 
!rowspan="2" colspan="2" |Candidate
!colspan="3" |Popular vote
|- 
! Votes
! %
! ±%
|-
| style="background-color:#FDEE00;" |
| style="text-align:left;" | Judi Partridge
| style="text-align:right;" |3,396
| style="text-align:right;" |52.72%
| style="text-align:right;" |+11.55%
|-
| style="background-color:#B31B1B;" |
| style="text-align:left;" | Neil Bos
| style="text-align:right;" |2,767
| style="text-align:right;" |42.95%
| style="text-align:right;" |n/a
|-
| style="background-color:#87A96B;" |
| style="text-align:left;" | Brian Gaspar
| style="text-align:right;" |279
| style="text-align:right;" |4.33%
| style="text-align:right;" |n/a
|-
| style="text-align:right;background-color:#FFFFFF;" colspan="2" |Total votes
| style="text-align:right;background-color:#FFFFFF;" |6,526
| style="text-align:right;background-color:#FFFFFF;" |100%
| style="text-align:right;background-color:#FFFFFF;" |
|- 
| style="text-align:right;background-color:#FFFFFF;" colspan="2" |Registered voters
| style="text-align:right;background-color:#FFFFFF;" |18,609
| style="text-align:right;background-color:#FFFFFF;" |35.07%
| style="text-align:right;background-color:#FFFFFF;" |-0.72%
|- 
| style="text-align:left;" colspan="6" |Note: All Hamilton Municipal Elections are officially non-partisan.  Note: Candidate campaign colours are based on the prominent colour used in campaign items (signs, literature, etc.)and are used as a visual differentiation between candidates.
|- 
| style="text-align:left;" colspan="13" |Sources: Hamilton, Ontario, City Clerk's Office 
|}

Neil Bos is the owner of Village Fish and Chips in Waterdown.
Brian Gaspar is the chairman of the Newalta/Hamilton Landfill Liaison Committee, an organization dedicated to opening dialogue concerning the area's local landfill.
Judi Partridge, who ran in the 2006 Election, is the current chair of the Hamilton Chamber of Commerce.

Public School Board election

|- 
!rowspan="2" colspan="2" |Candidate
!colspan="3" |Popular vote
|- 
! Votes
! %
! ±%
|-
| style="background-color:#B57EDC;" |
| style="text-align:left;" | Judith Bishop (incumbent)
!colspan="3" style="text-align:center;" | Acclaimed
|-
| style="text-align:right;background-color:#FFFFFF;" colspan="2" |Total Votes
!colspan="3" style="text-align:center;" |n/a
|-
| style="text-align:right;background-color:#FFFFFF;" colspan="2" |Registered Voters
!colspan="3" style="text-align:center;" |n/a
|-
| style="text-align:left;" colspan="6" |Note: All Hamilton Municipal Elections are officially non-partisan.  Note: Candidate campaign colours are based on the prominent colour used in campaign items (signs, literature, etc.)and are used as a visual differentiation between candidates.
|-
| style="text-align:left;" colspan="13" |Sources: Hamilton, Ontario City Clerk's Office
|}

Trustee Judith Bishop, who had served since 1988, was acclaimed in Wards One and Two.

|- 
!rowspan="2" colspan="2" |Candidate
!colspan="3" |Popular vote
|- 
! Votes
! %
! ±%
|-
| style="background-color:#0892D0;" |
| style="text-align:left;" | Tim Simmons (incumbent)
| style="text-align:right;" |3,137	
| style="text-align:right;" |74.00%
| style="text-align:right;" |+34.21%
|-
| style="background-color:#FFD12A;" |
| style="text-align:left;" |  Steven Paul Denault
| style="text-align:right;" |1,102	
| style="text-align:right;" |26.00%
| style="text-align:right;" |n/a
|-
| style="text-align:right;background-color:#FFFFFF;" colspan="2" |Total Votes
| style="text-align:right;background-color:#FFFFFF;" |5,151
| style="text-align:right;background-color:#FFFFFF;" |100%
| style="text-align:right;background-color:#FFFFFF;" |
|- 
| style="text-align:right;background-color:#FFFFFF;" colspan="2" |Registered Voters
| style="text-align:right;background-color:#FFFFFF;" |17,385
| style="text-align:right;background-color:#FFFFFF;" |29.60%
| style="text-align:right;background-color:#FFFFFF;" |n/a
|- 
| style="text-align:left;" colspan="6" |Note: All Hamilton Municipal Elections are officially non-partisan.  Note: Candidate campaign colours are based on the prominent colour used in campaign items (signs, literature, etc.)and are used as a visual differentiation between candidates.
|- 
| style="text-align:left;" colspan="13" |Sources: Hamilton, Ontario City Clerk's Office 
|}

 Sitting trustee Tim Simmons sought re-election.
 Steven Denault ran in Ward 9 in 2006 for the Catholic Board, gaining less than 8% of votes cast.

|- 
!rowspan="2" colspan="2" |Candidate
!colspan="3" |Popular vote
|- 
! Votes
! %
! ±%
|-
| style="background-color:#8DB600"|
| style="text-align:left;" | Ray E. Mulholland (incumbent)
| style="text-align:right;" |2,913	
| style="text-align:right;" |48.58%
| style="text-align:right;" |-10.20%
|-
| style="background-color:#9BDDFF"|
| style="text-align:left;" |  Cindy Kennedy
| style="text-align:right;" |1,439	
| style="text-align:right;" |24.49%
| style="text-align:right;" |n/a
|-
| style="background-color:#FF0000;" |
| style="text-align:left;" |  Julian Holland
| style="text-align:right;" |1,057	
| style="text-align:right;" |17.99%
| style="text-align:right;" |n/a
|-
| style="background-color:#663854;" |
| style="text-align:left;" |  Bob Green Innes
| style="text-align:right;" |466	
| style="text-align:right;" |7.93%
| style="text-align:right;" |n/a
|-
| style="text-align:right;background-color:#FFFFFF;" colspan="2" |Total Votes
| style="text-align:right;background-color:#FFFFFF;" |5,875
| style="text-align:right;background-color:#FFFFFF;" |100%
| style="text-align:right;background-color:#FFFFFF;" |
|- 
| style="text-align:right;background-color:#FFFFFF;" colspan="2" |Registered Voters
| style="text-align:right;background-color:#FFFFFF;" |18,561
| style="text-align:right;background-color:#FFFFFF;" |31.65%
| style="text-align:right;background-color:#FFFFFF;" |n/a
|- 
| style="text-align:left;" colspan="6" |Note: All Hamilton Municipal Elections are officially non-partisan.  Note: Candidate campaign colours are based on the prominent colour used in campaign items (signs, literature, etc.)and are used as a visual differentiation between candidates.
|- 
| style="text-align:left;" colspan="13" |Sources: Hamilton, Ontario City Clerk's Office 
|}

Julian Holland was a professor of English and Cultural Studies at McMaster University.
 Bob Green Innes was a professional engineer and former candidate for provincial parliament in Hamilton East—Stoney Creek for the Family Coalition Party.
Cindy Kennedy, a Delta High School alumni, worked with 'People for Education', a non-profit organization that promotes public education.
 Long-time trustee Ray Mulholland stood for re-election.

|- 
!rowspan="2" colspan="2" |Candidate
!colspan="3" |Popular vote
|- 
! Votes
! %
! ±%
|-
| style="background-color:#FF7E00;" |
| style="text-align:left;" | Todd White
| style="text-align:right;" |3,017	
| style="text-align:right;" |49.36%
| style="text-align:right;" |n/a
|-
| style="background-color:#FF0800;" |
| style="text-align:left;" | Lorri Cooke
| style="text-align:right;" |1,291		
| style="text-align:right;" |21.12%
| style="text-align:right;" |n/a
|-
| style="background-color:#0047AB;" |
| style="text-align:left;" | Ron English (incumbent)
| style="text-align:right;" |1,173	
| style="text-align:right;" |19.19%
| style="text-align:right;" |-34.56%
|-
| style="background-color:#004225;" |
| style="text-align:left;" | Pervez Muhammad
| style="text-align:right;" |631
| style="text-align:right;" |10.32%
| style="text-align:right;" |n/a
|-
| style="text-align:right;background-color:#FFFFFF;" colspan="2" |Total Votes
| style="text-align:right;background-color:#FFFFFF;" |6,570
| style="text-align:right;background-color:#FFFFFF;" |100%
| style="text-align:right;background-color:#FFFFFF;" |
|- 
| style="text-align:right;background-color:#FFFFFF;" colspan="2" |Registered Voters
| style="text-align:right;background-color:#FFFFFF;" |17,597
| style="text-align:right;background-color:#FFFFFF;" |37.30%
| style="text-align:right;background-color:#FFFFFF;" |n/a
|- 
| style="text-align:left;" colspan="6" |Note: All Hamilton Municipal Elections are officially non-partisan.  Note: Candidate campaign colours are based on the prominent colour used in campaign items (signs, literature, etc.)and are used as a visual differentiation between candidates.
|- 
| style="text-align:left;" colspan="13" |Sources: Hamilton, Ontario City Clerk's Office 
|}

 Trustee Ron English filed to run for re-election.
Todd White was Hamilton East—Stoney Creek New Democrat MPP Paul Miller's executive assistant.
Pervez Muhammad filed to run on September 6.

|- 
!rowspan="2" colspan="2" |Candidate
!colspan="3" |Popular vote
|- 
! Votes
! %
! ±%
|-
| style="background-color:#00BFFF;" |
| style="text-align:left;" | Laura Peddle (incumbent)
| style="text-align:right;" |3,417	
| style="text-align:right;" |44.74%
| style="text-align:right;" |+7.19%
|-
| style="background-color:#663854;" |
| style="text-align:left;" |  Kathy Archer
| style="text-align:right;" |2,829	
| style="text-align:right;" |37.04%
| style="text-align:right;" |+0.86%
|-
| style="background-color:#FFD12A;" |
| style="text-align:left;" |  Jeannie Martel
| style="text-align:right;" |1,392	
| style="text-align:right;" |18.22%
| style="text-align:right;" |n/a
|-
| style="text-align:right;background-color:#FFFFFF;" colspan="2" |Total Votes
| style="text-align:right;background-color:#FFFFFF;" |7,638
| style="text-align:right;background-color:#FFFFFF;" |100%
| style="text-align:right;background-color:#FFFFFF;" |
|- 
| style="text-align:right;background-color:#FFFFFF;" colspan="2" |Registered Voters
| style="text-align:right;background-color:#FFFFFF;" |20,338
| style="text-align:right;background-color:#FFFFFF;" |37.55%
| style="text-align:right;background-color:#FFFFFF;" |n/a
|- 
| style="text-align:left;" colspan="6" |Note: All Hamilton Municipal Elections are officially non-partisan.  Note: Candidate campaign colours are based on the prominent colour used in campaign items (signs, literature, etc.)and are used as a visual differentiation between candidates.
|- 
| style="text-align:left;" colspan="13" |Sources: Hamilton, Ontario City Clerk's Office 
|}

 Veteran trustee Laura Peddle ran for another term.
 Contesting the Ward 6 race was Kathy Archer, who ran a very close second to Trustee Peddle in the 2006 election.
Jeannie Martel was the director of the Hamilton Injured Workers Group board.

|- 
!rowspan="2" colspan="2" |Candidate
!colspan="3" |Popular vote
|- 
! Votes
! %
! ±%
|-
| style="background-color:#99BADD;" |
| style="text-align:left;" | Lillian Orban (incumbent)
| style="text-align:right;" |6,121	
| style="text-align:right;" |60.77%
| style="text-align:right;" |+3.5%
|-
| style="background-color:#FF7E00;" |
| style="text-align:left;" |  Marlon Picken
| style="text-align:right;" |3,951	
| style="text-align:right;" |39.23%
| style="text-align:right;" |n/a
|-
| style="text-align:right;background-color:#FFFFFF;" colspan="2" |Total Votes
| style="text-align:right;background-color:#FFFFFF;" |11,020
| style="text-align:right;background-color:#FFFFFF;" |100%
| style="text-align:right;background-color:#FFFFFF;" |
|- 
| style="text-align:right;background-color:#FFFFFF;" colspan="2" |Registered Voters
| style="text-align:right;background-color:#FFFFFF;" |28,374
| style="text-align:right;background-color:#FFFFFF;" |38.80%
| style="text-align:right;background-color:#FFFFFF;" |n/a
|- 
| style="text-align:left;" colspan="6" |Note: All Hamilton Municipal Elections are officially non-partisan.  Note: Candidate campaign colours are based on the prominent colour used in campaign items (signs, literature, etc.)and are used as a visual differentiation between candidates.
|- 
| style="text-align:left;" colspan="13" |Sources: Hamilton, Ontario City Clerk's Office 
|}

Sitting trustee Lillian Orban sought re-election.
Marlon Picken was a local New Democratic activist and member of the Hamilton District Labour Council's Peace and Human Rights Commission.

|- 
!rowspan="2" colspan="2" |Candidate
!colspan="3" |Popular vote
|- 
! Votes
! %
! ±%
|-
| style="background-color:#FFA700;" |
| style="text-align:left;" | Wes Hicks (incumbent)
| style="text-align:right;" |5,642	
| style="text-align:right;" |63.38%
| style="text-align:right;" |+10.25%
|-
| style="background-color:#A3C1AD;" |
| style="text-align:left;" | Sylvia Thomas
| style="text-align:right;" |2,089	
| style="text-align:right;" |23.47%
| style="text-align:right;" |+7.4%
|-
| style="background-color:#0047AB;" |
| style="text-align:left;" | Al Pierce
| style="text-align:right;" |1,171	
| style="text-align:right;" |13.15%
| style="text-align:right;" |-17.65%
|-
| style="text-align:right;background-color:#FFFFFF;" colspan="2" |Total Votes
| style="text-align:right;background-color:#FFFFFF;" |8,902
| style="text-align:right;background-color:#FFFFFF;" |100%
| style="text-align:right;background-color:#FFFFFF;" |
|- 
| style="text-align:right;background-color:#FFFFFF;" colspan="2" |Registered Voters
| style="text-align:right;background-color:#FFFFFF;" |22,918
| style="text-align:right;background-color:#FFFFFF;" |38.8%
| style="text-align:right;background-color:#FFFFFF;" |+2.6%
|- 
| style="text-align:left;" colspan="6" |Note: All Hamilton Municipal Elections are officially non-partisan.  Note: Candidate campaign colours are based on the prominent colour used in campaign items (signs, literature, etc.)and are used as a visual differentiation between candidates.
|- 
| style="text-align:left;" colspan="13" |Sources: Hamilton, Ontario City Clerk's Office 
|}

Incumbent Wes Hicks stood for re-election after a surprise win over former trustee Al Pierce in 2006 .
Al Pierce was trustee from 2003 to 2006 when he was defeated by current trustee Wes Hicks.
Sylvia Thomas contested the seat in 2006.

|- 
!rowspan="2" colspan="2" |Candidate
!colspan="3" |Popular vote
|- 
! Votes
! %
! ±%
|-
| style="background-color:#FF7F00;" |
| style="text-align:left;" | Robert Barlow (incumbent)
| style="text-align:right;" |4,165	
| style="text-align:right;" |50.29%
| style="text-align:right;" |+2.75%
|-
| style="background-color:#00BFFF;" |
| style="text-align:left;" | John Davidson
| style="text-align:right;" |2,857	
| style="text-align:right;" |34.5%
| style="text-align:right;" |-0.69%
|-
| style="background-color:"#8DB600"|
| style="text-align:left;" | Bruce Percy
| style="text-align:right;" |1,260	
| style="text-align:right;" |15.21%
| style="text-align:right;" |n/a
|-
| style="text-align:right;background-color:#FFFFFF;" colspan="2" |Total votes
| style="text-align:right;background-color:#FFFFFF;" |9,003
| style="text-align:right;background-color:#FFFFFF;" |100%
| style="text-align:right;background-color:#FFFFFF;" |
|- 
| style="text-align:right;background-color:#FFFFFF;" colspan="2" |Registered voters
| style="text-align:right;background-color:#FFFFFF;" |23,717
| style="text-align:right;background-color:#FFFFFF;" |38%
| style="text-align:right;background-color:#FFFFFF;" |+7.1%
|- 
| style="text-align:left;" colspan="6" |Note: All Hamilton Municipal Elections are officially non-partisan.  Note: Candidate campaign colours are based on the prominent colour used in campaign items (signs, literature, etc.)and are used as a visual differentiation between candidates.
|- 
| style="text-align:left;" colspan="13" |Sources: Hamilton, Ontario, City Clerk's Office 
|}

 Sitting trustee, Robert Barlow, sought re-election.
 John Davidson was trustee from 2003 to 2006 when he was defeated by current trustee Robert Barlow.
Bruce Percy was a first-time candidate.

|- 
!rowspan="2" colspan="2" |Candidate
!colspan="3" |Popular vote
|- 
! Votes
! %
! ±%
|-
| style="background-color:#FF7F00;" |
| style="text-align:left;" | Alex Johnstone
| style="text-align:right;" |8,586	
| style="text-align:right;" |66.9%
| style="text-align:right;" |n/a
|-
| style="background-color:#00009C;" |
| style="text-align:left;" |Ying Chan
| style="text-align:right;" |4,249	
| style="text-align:right;" |33.1%
| style="text-align:right;" |n/a
|-
| style="text-align:right;background-color:#FFFFFF;" colspan="2" |Total votes
| style="text-align:right;background-color:#FFFFFF;" |14,692
| style="text-align:right;background-color:#FFFFFF;" |100%
| style="text-align:right;background-color:#FFFFFF;" |
|- 
| style="text-align:right;background-color:#FFFFFF;" colspan="2" |Registered voters
| style="text-align:right;background-color:#FFFFFF;" |35,460
| style="text-align:right;background-color:#FFFFFF;" |41.4%
| style="text-align:right;background-color:#FFFFFF;" |+14.35%
|- 
| style="text-align:left;" colspan="6" |Note: All Hamilton Municipal Elections are officially non-partisan.  Note: Candidate campaign colours are based on the prominent colour used in campaign items (signs, literature, etc.)and are used as a visual differentiation between candidates.
|- 
| style="text-align:left;" colspan="13" |Sources: Hamilton, Ontario, City Clerk's Office 
|}

Ying Chan was an Ancaster resident and co-founder of "Ancaster Parents for French Immersion", a group dedicated to expanding French immersion courses in area schools. Chan was endorsed by fundamentalist Christian organizations, such as the Campaign Life Coalition, Hamilton-Wentworth Family Action Council, and Public Education Advocates for Christian Equity
Alex Johnstone was a social worker with a specialization in child welfare. She worked as a child and family support worker for the Vancouver School Board, a developmental worker to an autistic child, and volunteered with Big Brothers Big Sisters and Free The Children. Alex was formally a New Democratic candidate for the Ancaster—Dundas—Flamborough—Westdale riding.

|- 
!rowspan="2" colspan="2" |Candidate
!colspan="3" |Popular vote
|- 
! Votes
! %
! ±%
|-
| style="background-color:#FF7F00;" |
| style="text-align:left;" | Jessica Brennan (Incumbent)
| style="text-align:right;" |4,957	
| style="text-align:right;" |81.54%
| style="text-align:right;" |+2.73%
|-
| style="background-color:#663854;" |
| style="text-align:left;" |Klaas Detmar
| style="text-align:right;" |1,122	
| style="text-align:right;" |18.46%
| style="text-align:right;" |n/a
|-
| style="text-align:right;background-color:#FFFFFF;" colspan="2" |Total votes
| style="text-align:right;background-color:#FFFFFF;" |6,079
| style="text-align:right;background-color:#FFFFFF;" |100%
| style="text-align:right;background-color:#FFFFFF;" |
|- 
| style="text-align:right;background-color:#FFFFFF;" colspan="2" |Registered voters
| style="text-align:right;background-color:#FFFFFF;" |15,146
| style="text-align:right;background-color:#FFFFFF;" |45.8%
| style="text-align:right;background-color:#FFFFFF;" |+7.7%
|- 
| style="text-align:left;" colspan="6" |Note: All Hamilton Municipal Elections are officially non-partisan.  Note: Candidate campaign colours are based on the prominent colour used in campaign items (signs, literature, etc.)and are used as a visual differentiation between candidates.
|- 
| style="text-align:left;" colspan="13" |Sources: Hamilton, Ontario, City Clerk's Office 
|}

Jessica Brennan, then-Chair of the Board, sought re-election in her Dundas ward.
Klaas Detmar was a carpenter-contractor, who self identified as a "Christian" candidate.

|- 
!rowspan="2" colspan="2" |Candidate
!colspan="3" |Popular vote
|- 
! Votes
! %
! ±%
|-
| style="background-color:#8A3324;" |
| style="text-align:left;" | Karen Turkstra  (Incumbent) 
!colspan="3" style="text-align:center;" | Acclaimed
|-
| style="text-align:right;background-color:#FFFFFF;" colspan="2" |Total votes
!colspan="3" style="text-align:center;" |n/a
|-
| style="text-align:right;background-color:#FFFFFF;" colspan="2" |Registered voters
!colspan="3" style="text-align:center;" |n/a
|-
| style="text-align:left;" colspan="6" |Note: All Hamilton Municipal Elections are officially non-partisan.  Note: Candidate campaign colours are based on the prominent colour used in campaign items (signs, literature, etc.)and are used as a visual differentiation between candidates.
|-
| style="text-align:left;" colspan="13" |Sources: Hamilton, Ontario, City Clerk's Office
|}

Karen Turkstra, the incumbent trustee, was acclaimed to another term.

Catholic School Board election
  

|- 
!rowspan="2" colspan="2" |Candidate
!colspan="3" |Popular vote
|- 
! Votes
! %
! ±%
|-
| style="background-color:#4F7942;" |
| style="text-align:left;" | Mark Valvasori
| style="text-align:right;" |1,171	
| style="text-align:right;" |43.39%
| style="text-align:right;" |n/a
|-
| style="background-color:#5D8AA8;" |
| style="text-align:left;" | Paula Linger
| style="text-align:right;" |768	
| style="text-align:right;" |28.45%
| style="text-align:right;" |n/a
|-
| style="background-color:#FF0000;" |
| style="text-align:left;" |  Louis Agro (incumbent)
| style="text-align:right;" |760	
| style="text-align:right;" |28.16%
| style="text-align:right;" |-32.22%
|-
| style="text-align:right;background-color:#FFFFFF;" colspan="2" |Total Votes
| style="text-align:right;background-color:#FFFFFF;" |2,699
| style="text-align:right;background-color:#FFFFFF;" |100%
| style="text-align:right;background-color:#FFFFFF;" |
|- 
| style="text-align:right;background-color:#FFFFFF;" colspan="2" |Registered Voters
| style="text-align:right;background-color:#FFFFFF;" |7,011
| style="text-align:right;background-color:#FFFFFF;" |42.8%
| style="text-align:right;background-color:#FFFFFF;" |+10.2%
|- 
| style="text-align:left;" colspan="6" |Note: All Hamilton Municipal Elections are officially non-partisan.  Note: Candidate campaign colours are based on the prominent colour used in campaign items (signs, literature, etc.)and are used as a visual differentiation between candidates.
|- 
| style="text-align:left;" colspan="13" |Sources: Hamilton, Ontario City Clerk's Office 
|}

 Louis Agro sought re-election for Wards 1 and 2.
 Paula Linger
 Mark Valvasori was a professor at Mohawk College and a football coach at St. Mary's Catholic Secondary School in Ward One.

|- 
!rowspan="2" colspan="2" |Candidate
!colspan="3" |Popular vote
|- 
! Votes
! %
! ±%
|-
| style="background-color:#FF0000;" |
| style="text-align:left;" | Ralph Agostino (incumbent)
| style="text-align:right;" |2,454	
| style="text-align:right;" |66.32%
| style="text-align:right;" |+10.96%
|-
| style="background-color:#00BFFF;" |
| style="text-align:left;" | Brian Nestor
| style="text-align:right;" |860	
| style="text-align:right;" |23.24%
| style="text-align:right;" |+13.44%
|-
| style="background-color:#8DB600"|
| style="text-align:left;" |  Calogero Milazzo
| style="text-align:right;" |386	
| style="text-align:right;" |10.43%
| style="text-align:right;" |n/a
|-
| style="text-align:right;background-color:#FFFFFF;" colspan="2" |Total Votes
| style="text-align:right;background-color:#FFFFFF;" |3,700
| style="text-align:right;background-color:#FFFFFF;" |100%
| style="text-align:right;background-color:#FFFFFF;" |
|- 
| style="text-align:right;background-color:#FFFFFF;" colspan="2" |Registered Voters
| style="text-align:right;background-color:#FFFFFF;" |10,545
| style="text-align:right;background-color:#FFFFFF;" |38.8%
| style="text-align:right;background-color:#FFFFFF;" |+1.9%
|- 
| style="text-align:left;" colspan="6" |Note: All Hamilton Municipal Elections are officially non-partisan.  Note: Candidate campaign colours are based on the prominent colour used in campaign items (signs, literature, etc.)and are used as a visual differentiation between candidates.
|- 
| style="text-align:left;" colspan="13" |Sources: Hamilton, Ontario City Clerk's Office 
|}

 Incumbent trustee Ralph Agostino sought re-election in Wards 3 and 4.
 Calogero Milazzo
 Brian Nestor

|- 
!rowspan="2" colspan="2" |Candidate
!colspan="3" |Popular vote
|- 
! Votes
! %
! ±%
|-
| style="background-color:#FF0000;" |
| style="text-align:left;" | Sam Agostino 
| style="text-align:right;" |1,518	
| style="text-align:right;" |40.94%
| style="text-align:right;" |+0.59%
|-
| style="background-color:#4F7942;" |
| style="text-align:left;" | Frank Ciotti
| style="text-align:right;" |1,188	
| style="text-align:right;" |32.04%
| style="text-align:right;" |n/a
|-
| style="background-color:#FE6F5E;" |
| style="text-align:left;" | Linda Di Bartolomeo (incumbent)
| style="text-align:right;" |1,002
| style="text-align:right;" |27.02%
| style="text-align:right;" |-17.6%
|-
| style="text-align:right;background-color:#FFFFFF;" colspan="2" |Total Votes
| style="text-align:right;background-color:#FFFFFF;" |3,708
| style="text-align:right;background-color:#FFFFFF;" |100%
| style="text-align:right;background-color:#FFFFFF;" |
|- 
| style="text-align:right;background-color:#FFFFFF;" colspan="2" |Registered Voters
| style="text-align:right;background-color:#FFFFFF;" |7,895
| style="text-align:right;background-color:#FFFFFF;" |51.1%
| style="text-align:right;background-color:#FFFFFF;" |+5.3%
|- 
| style="text-align:left;" colspan="6" |Note: All Hamilton Municipal Elections are officially non-partisan.  Note: Candidate campaign colours are based on the prominent colour used in campaign items (signs, literature, etc.)and are used as a visual differentiation between candidates.
|- 
| style="text-align:left;" colspan="13" |Sources: Hamilton, Ontario City Clerk's Office 
|}

 Sam Agostino
 A former teacher, union president and municipal candidate Frank Ciotti sought election in Ward 5.
 Incumbent Trustee Linda DiBartolomeo filed for re-election on September 6.

|- 
!rowspan="2" colspan="2" |Candidate
!colspan="3" |Popular vote
|- 
! Votes
! %
! ±%
|-
| style="background-color:#FFD12A;" |
| style="text-align:left;" | Kyran Kennedy (incumbent)
| style="text-align:right;" |1,457	
| style="text-align:right;" |41.77%
| style="text-align:right;" |Note 1
|-
| style="background-color:#0892D0;" |
| style="text-align:left;" | Michael Ecker
| style="text-align:right;" |1,392	
| style="text-align:right;" |39.91%
| style="text-align:right;" |n/a
|-
| style="background-color:#663854;" |
| style="text-align:left;" | Nick Pellegrino 
| style="text-align:right;" |639
| style="text-align:right;" |18.32%
| style="text-align:right;" |n/a
|-
| style="text-align:right;background-color:#FFFFFF;" colspan="2" |Total Votes
| style="text-align:right;background-color:#FFFFFF;" |3,488
| style="text-align:right;background-color:#FFFFFF;" |100%
| style="text-align:right;background-color:#FFFFFF;" |
|- 
| style="text-align:right;background-color:#FFFFFF;" colspan="2" |Registered Voters
| style="text-align:right;background-color:#FFFFFF;" |7,567
| style="text-align:right;background-color:#FFFFFF;" |49.9%
| style="text-align:right;background-color:#FFFFFF;" |n/a
|- 
| style="text-align:left;" colspan="6" |Note 1: Candidate was acclaimed in the previous election.Note: All Hamilton Municipal Elections are officially non-partisan.  Note: Candidate campaign colours are based on the prominent colour used in campaign items (signs, literature, etc.)and are used as a visual differentiation between candidates.
|- 
| style="text-align:left;" colspan="13" |Sources: Hamilton, Ontario City Clerk's Office 
|}

 Michael Ecker
 The 82-year-old Father Kyran Kennedy, a veteran trustee and former parish priest for St. Margaret Mary, sought another term.
 Nick Pellegrino

|- 
!rowspan="2" colspan="2" |Candidate
!colspan="3" |Popular vote
|- 
! Votes
! %
! ±%
|-
| style="background-color:#FF0000;" |
| style="text-align:left;" | Pat Daly  (Incumbent) 
!colspan="3"  style="text-align:center;" | Acclaimed
|-
| style="text-align:right;background-color:#FFFFFF;" colspan="2" |Total Votes
!colspan="3"  style="text-align:center;" |n/a
|-
| style="text-align:right;background-color:#FFFFFF;" colspan="2" |Registered Voters
!colspan="3"  style="text-align:center;" |n/a
|-
| style="text-align:left;" colspan="6" |Note: All Hamilton Municipal Elections are officially non-partisan.  Note: Candidate campaign colours are based on the prominent colour used in campaign items (signs, literature, etc.)and are used as a visual differentiation between candidates.
|-
| style="text-align:left;" colspan="13" |Sources: Hamilton, Ontario City Clerk's Office
|}

Board Chair and sitting trustee, Pat Daly, was acclaimed to his Mountain seat.

|- 
!rowspan="2" colspan="2" |Candidate
!colspan="3" |Popular vote
|- 
! Votes
! %
! ±%
|-
| style="background-color:#4F7942;" |
| style="text-align:left;" | John Valvasori
| style="text-align:right;" |2,346	
| style="text-align:right;" |44.65%
| style="text-align:right;" |n/a
|-
| style="background-color:#FF0000;" |
| style="text-align:left;" | Sergio Manchia (incumbent)
| style="text-align:right;" |1,826	
| style="text-align:right;" |34.75%
| style="text-align:right;" |Note 1
|-
| style="background-color:#00009C;" |
| style="text-align:left;" | Raphael Kolenko 
| style="text-align:right;" |684	
| style="text-align:right;" |13.02%
| style="text-align:right;" |n/a
|-
| style="background-color:#00FF00;" |
| style="text-align:left;" | Jack Freiburger 
| style="text-align:right;" |398
| style="text-align:right;" |7.58%
| style="text-align:right;" |n/a
|-
| style="text-align:right;background-color:#FFFFFF;" colspan="2" |Total Votes
| style="text-align:right;background-color:#FFFFFF;" |5,254
| style="text-align:right;background-color:#FFFFFF;" |100%
| style="text-align:right;background-color:#FFFFFF;" |
|- 
| style="text-align:right;background-color:#FFFFFF;" colspan="2" |Registered Voters
| style="text-align:right;background-color:#FFFFFF;" |10,988
| style="text-align:right;background-color:#FFFFFF;" |50.5%
| style="text-align:right;background-color:#FFFFFF;" |n/a
|- 
| style="text-align:left;" colspan="6" |Note 1: Candidate was acclaimed last election.Note: All Hamilton Municipal Elections are officially non-partisan.  Note: Candidate campaign colours are based on the prominent colour used in campaign items (signs, literature, etc.)and are used as a visual differentiation between candidates.
|- 
| style="text-align:left;" colspan="13" |Sources: Hamilton, Ontario City Clerk's Office 
|}

 John Freiburger joined the race on September 7.
 Raphael Kolenko, a business owner who lives in the ward, filed to run in Ward 8.
 Sergio Manchia was the sitting trustee for Ward 8.
 John Valvasori was the principal of St. Thomas More Catholic Secondary School in Ward 8 from 1997 to 2007, when he retired.

|- 
!rowspan="2" colspan="2" |Candidate
!colspan="3" |Popular vote
|- 
! Votes
! %
! ±%
|-
| style="background-color:#FF0000;" |
| style="text-align:left;" | Mary Nardini (incumbent)
| style="text-align:right;" |4,788	
| style="text-align:right;" |30.08%
| style="text-align:right;" |-6.78%
|-
| style="background-color:#4F7942;" |
| style="text-align:left;" | Paul Di Francesco
| style="text-align:right;" |4,276
| style="text-align:right;" |26.87%
| style="text-align:right;" |n/a
|-
| style="background-color:#FF0000;" |
| style="text-align:left;" | Raymond Bartolotti (incumbent)
| style="text-align:right;" |3,237
| style="text-align:right;" |30.34%
| style="text-align:right;" |-6.3%
|-
| style="background-color:#0047AB;" |
| style="text-align:left;" | Anthony Di Brizzi
| style="text-align:right;" |1,688
| style="text-align:right;" |10.61%
| style="text-align:right;" |n/a
|-
| style="background-color:#FF003F;" |
| style="text-align:left;" | Dan Lohin
| style="text-align:right;" |1,543
| style="text-align:right;" |9.69%
| style="text-align:right;" |n/a
|-
| style="background-color:#87A96B;" |
| style="text-align:left;" | Saji Anthony
| style="text-align:right;" |384
| style="text-align:right;" |2.41%
| style="text-align:right;" |n/a
|-
| style="text-align:right;background-color:#FFFFFF;" colspan="2" |Total Votes
| style="text-align:right;background-color:#FFFFFF;" |15,916
| style="text-align:right;background-color:#FFFFFF;" |100%
| style="text-align:right;background-color:#FFFFFF;" |
|- 
| style="text-align:right;background-color:#FFFFFF;" colspan="2" |Registered Voters
| style="text-align:right;background-color:#FFFFFF;" |20,758
| style="text-align:right;background-color:#FFFFFF;" |50.8%
| style="text-align:right;background-color:#FFFFFF;" |n/a
|- 
| style="text-align:left;" colspan="6" |Note: This ward elected two Catholic trustees and percentages are specific to each candidate, not for the overall total.Note: All Hamilton Municipal Elections are officially non-partisan.  Note: Candidate campaign colours are based on the prominent colour used in campaign items (signs, literature, etc.)and are used as a visual differentiation between candidates.
|- 
| style="text-align:left;" colspan="13" |Sources: Hamilton, Ontario City Clerk's Office 
|}

 Saji Anthony
 Raymond Bartolotti was one of two representatives for Wards 9, 10 and 11.
 Paul DiFrancesco was a principal with the Catholic School Board for 31 years before retiring in July 2010.
 Anthony DiBrizzi was a Stoney Creek resident who filed on July 21, 2010.
 Dan Lohin
 The last two-tier seat left in Hamilton was also represented by trustee Mary Nardini.

|- 
!rowspan="2" colspan="2" |Candidate
!colspan="3" |Popular vote
|- 
! Votes
! %
! ±%
|-
| style="background-color:#FF0000;" |
| style="text-align:left;" | Carolyn Cornale (incumbent)
| style="text-align:right;" |3,541	
| style="text-align:right;" |61.07%
| style="text-align:right;" |-3.81%
|-
| style="background-color:#663854;" |
| style="text-align:left;" | Rome D'Angelo
| style="text-align:right;" |1,772	
| style="text-align:right;" |30.56%
| style="text-align:right;" |n/a
|-
| style="background-color:#00009C;" |
| style="text-align:left;" | Dave Parsi-Strecker
| style="text-align:right;" |485
| style="text-align:right;" |8.36%
| style="text-align:right;" |n/a
|-
| style="text-align:right;background-color:#FFFFFF;" colspan="2" |Total Votes
| style="text-align:right;background-color:#FFFFFF;" |6,176
| style="text-align:right;background-color:#FFFFFF;" |100%
| style="text-align:right;background-color:#FFFFFF;" |
|- 
| style="text-align:right;background-color:#FFFFFF;" colspan="2" |Registered Voters
| style="text-align:right;background-color:#FFFFFF;" |14,500
| style="text-align:right;background-color:#FFFFFF;" |42.6%
| style="text-align:right;background-color:#FFFFFF;" |+10.4%
|- 
| style="text-align:left;" colspan="6" |Note: All Hamilton Municipal Elections are officially non-partisan.  Note: Candidate campaign colours are based on the prominent colour used in campaign items (signs, literature, etc.)and are used as a visual differentiation between candidates.
|- 
| style="text-align:left;" colspan="13" |Sources: Hamilton, Ontario City Clerk's Office 
|}

 Rome D'Angelo was the manager of Corporate Buildings and Technical Services for the City of Hamilton.
 Trustee Carolyn Cornale filed to run for re-election for the suburban Wards 12, 13, 14 and 15.
 Dave Parisi-Strecker

French Public School Board election

|- 
!rowspan="2" colspan="2" |Candidate
!colspan="3" |Popular vote
|- 
! Votes
! %
! ±%
|-
| style="background-color:#0892D0;" |
| style="text-align:left;" | Micheline Wylde  (Incumbent) 
!colspan="3" style="text-align:center;" | Acclaimed
|-
| style="text-align:right;background-color:#FFFFFF;" colspan="2" |Total Votes
!colspan="3" style="text-align:center;" |n/a
|-
| style="text-align:right;background-color:#FFFFFF;" colspan="2" |Registered Voters
!colspan="3" style="text-align:center;" |n/a
|-
| style="text-align:left;" colspan="6" |Note: All Hamilton Municipal Elections are officially non-partisan.  Note: Candidate campaign colours are based on the prominent colour used in campaign items (signs, literature, etc.)and are used as a visual differentiation between candidates.
|-
| style="text-align:left;" colspan="13" |Sources: Hamilton, Ontario City Clerk's Office
|}

Micheline Wylde is the incumbent trustee.

French Catholic School Board election

|- 
!rowspan="2" colspan="2" |Candidate
!colspan="3" |Popular vote
|- 
! Votes
! %
! ±%
|-
| style="background-color:#0892D0;" |
| style="text-align:left;" | Marcel Levesque  (Incumbent) 
!colspan="3" style="text-align:center;" | Acclaimed
|-
| style="text-align:right;background-color:#FFFFFF;" colspan="2" |Total Votes
!colspan="3" style="text-align:center;" |n/a
|- 
| style="text-align:right;background-color:#FFFFFF;" colspan="2" |Registered Voters
!colspan="3" style="text-align:center;" |n/a
|- 
| style="text-align:left;" colspan="6" |Note: All Hamilton Municipal Elections are officially non-partisan.  Note: Candidate campaign colours are based on the prominent colour used in campaign items (signs, literature, etc.)and are used as a visual differentiation between candidates.
|- 
| style="text-align:left;" colspan="13" |Sources: Hamilton, Ontario City Clerk's Office
|}

Marcel Levesque is the incumbent trustee.

Endorsements

|-
!rowspan="2" colspan="1"|Publication
!rowspan="2" colspan="2" |Candidate
!colspan="2" |Elected
|- 
! Yes
! No
|-
| style="text-align:left;" | The Hamilton Spectator
| style="background-color:#66023C;" |
| style="text-align:left;" | Fred Eisenberger
| style="background-color:#FFFFFF;" |
| style="background-color:#FF0000;" |
|- 
| style="text-align:left;" colspan="13" |Sources: Elliot, Howard. "The right man for the job," Hamilton Spectator, October 10, 2010, Editorial, A15.
|}

|-
!rowspan="2" colspan="3"|Candidate
!rowspan="2" colspan="1"|Seat Contested
!rowspan="2" colspan="1"|Endorsement
!colspan="2"|Elected
|- 
! Yes
! No
|-
| style="background-color:lightblue" rowspan="21" |
| style="background-color:#5D8AA8;" |
| style="text-align:left;" | Gino Spezalie
| style="text-align:right;" | Mayor
| style="text-align:right;" |Supportable
| style="background-color:#FFFFFF;" |
| style="background-color:#FF0000;" |
|- style="background-color:#lightblue"
| style="text-align:right;" colspan="3" | Total Supportable Mayoral Candidates
| 1 || 0 || 1
|-
|- style="background-color:#lightblue"
| style="text-align:right;" colspan="3" | Total Supportable Council Candidates
| 0 || 0 || 0
|-
| style="background-color:#663854;" |
| style="text-align:left;" | Bob Green Innes
| style="text-align:right;" |Public Trustee, Ward 4
| style="text-align:right;" |Supportable
| style="background-color:#FFFFFF;" |
| style="background-color:#FF0000;" |
|-
| style="background-color:#663854;" |
| style="text-align:left;" | Kathy Archer
| style="text-align:right;" |Public Trustee, Ward 6
| style="text-align:right;" |Supportable
| style="background-color:#FFFFFF;" |
| style="background-color:#FF0000;" |
|-
| style="background-color:#99BADD;" |
| style="text-align:left;" | Lillian Orban
| style="text-align:right;" |Public Trustee, Ward 7
| style="text-align:right;" |Supportable
| style="background-color:#00FF00;" |
| style="background-color:#FFFFFF;" |
|-
| style="background-color:#0047AB;" |
| style="text-align:left;" | Al Pierce
| style="text-align:right;" |Public Trustee, Ward 8
| style="text-align:right;" |Supportable
| style="background-color:#FFFFFF;" |
| style="background-color:#FF0000;" |
|-
| style="background-color:#00BFFF;" |
| style="text-align:left;" | John Davidson
| style="text-align:right;" |Public Trustee, Ward 9&10
| style="text-align:right;" |Supportable
| style="background-color:#FFFFFF;" |
| style="background-color:#FF0000;" |
|-
| style="background-color:#00009C;" |
| style="text-align:left;" | Ying Chang
| style="text-align:right;" |Public Trustee, Ward 11&12
| style="text-align:right;" |Supportable
| style="background-color:#FFFFFF;" |
| style="background-color:#FF0000;" |
|-
| style="background-color:#663854;" |
| style="text-align:left;" |Klaas Detmar
| style="text-align:right;" |Public Trustee, Ward 13
| style="text-align:right;" |Supportable
| style="background-color:#FFFFFF;" |
| style="background-color:#FF0000;" |
|- style="background-color:#lightblue"
| style="text-align:right;" colspan="3" | Total Supportable Public Trustee Candidates
| 7 || 1 || 6
|-
| style="background-color:#FF0000;" |
| style="text-align:left;" | Ralph Agostino
| style="text-align:right;" |Catholic Trustee, Wards 3&4
| style="text-align:right;" |Supportable
| style="background-color:#00FF00;" |
| style="background-color:#FFFFFF;" |
|-
| style="background-color:#FFD12A;" |
| style="text-align:left;" | Kyran Kennedy
| style="text-align:right;" |Catholic Trustee, Ward 6
| style="text-align:right;" |Supportable
| style="background-color:#00FF00;" |
| style="background-color:#FFFFFF;" |
|-
| style="background-color:#663854;" |
| style="text-align:left;" |Nick Pellegrino
| style="text-align:right;" |Catholic Trustee, Ward 6
| style="text-align:right;" |Supportable
| style="background-color:#FFFFFF;" |
| style="background-color:#FF0000;" |
|-
| style="background-color:#FF0000;" |
| style="text-align:left;" | Pat Daly
| style="text-align:right;" |Catholic Trustee, Ward 7
| style="text-align:right;" |Supportable
| style="background-color:#00FF00;" |
| style="background-color:#FFFFFF;" |
|-
| style="background-color:#663854;" |
| style="text-align:left;" |Sergio Manchia
| style="text-align:right;" |Catholic Trustee, Ward 8
| style="text-align:right;" |Supportable
| style="background-color:#FFFFFF;" |
| style="background-color:#FF0000;" |
|-
| style="background-color:#4F7942;" |
| style="text-align:left;" | John Valvasori
| style="text-align:right;" |Catholic Trustee, Ward 8
| style="text-align:right;" |Supportable
| style="background-color:#00FF00;" |
| style="background-color:#FFFFFF;" |
|-
| style="background-color:#FF0000;" |
| style="text-align:left;" |Raymond Bartolotti
| style="text-align:right;" |Catholic Trustee, Wards 9,10&11
| style="text-align:right;" |Supportable
| style="background-color:#FFFFFF;" |
| style="background-color:#FF0000;" |
|-
| style="background-color:#FF0000;" |
| style="text-align:left;" | Carolyn Cornale
| style="text-align:right;" |Catholic Trustee, Wards 12,13,14&15
| style="text-align:right;" |Supportable
| style="background-color:#00FF00;" |
| style="background-color:#FFFFFF;" |
|-
| style="background-color:#663854;" |
| style="text-align:left;" |Rome D'Angelo
| style="text-align:right;" |Catholic Trustee, Wards 12,13,14&15
| style="text-align:right;" |Supportable
| style="background-color:#FFFFFF;" |
| style="background-color:#FF0000;" |
|- style="background-color:#lightblue"
| style="text-align:right;" colspan="3" | Total Supportable Catholic Trustee Candidates
| 9 || 5 || 4
|- style="background-color:#E9E9E9;"
| style="text-align:right;" colspan="4" | Total Supportable Candidates
| 17 || 6 || 11
|-
|colspan="7" style="background-color:#E9E9E9" | 
|-
| style="background-color:pink" rowspan="17" |
|- style="background-color:#pink"
| style="text-align:right;" colspan="3" | Total Not Supportable Mayoral Candidates
| 0 || 0 || 0
|-
| style="background-color:#FF7F00;" |
| style="text-align:left;" | Brian McHattie
| style="text-align:right;" |Councillor, Ward 1
| style="text-align:right;" |Not Supportable
| style="background-color:#00FF00;" |
| style="background-color:#FFFFFF;" |
|- style="background-color:#pink"
| style="text-align:right;" colspan="3" | Total Not Supportable Council Candidates
| 1 || 1 || 0
|-
| style="background-color:#B57EDC;" |
| style="text-align:left;" | Judith Bishop
| style="text-align:right;" |Public Trustee, Wards 1&2
| style="text-align:right;" |Not Supportable
| style="background-color:#00FF00;" |
| style="background-color:#FFFFFF;" |
|-
| style="background-color:#0892D0;" |
| style="text-align:left;" | Tim Simmons
| style="text-align:right;" |Public Trustee, Ward 3
| style="text-align:right;" |Not Supportable
| style="background-color:#00FF00;" |
| style="background-color:#FFFFFF;" |
|-
| style="background-color:#8DB600"|
| style="text-align:left;" | Ray Mulholland
| style="text-align:right;" |Public Trustee, Ward 4
| style="text-align:right;" |Not Supportable
| style="background-color:#00FF00;" |
| style="background-color:#FFFFFF;" |
|-
| style="background-color:#0047AB;" |
| style="text-align:left;" | Ronald English
| style="text-align:right;" |Public Trustee, Ward 5
| style="text-align:right;" |Not Supportable
| style="background-color:#FFFFFF;" |
| style="background-color:#FF0000;" |
|-
| style="background-color:#00BFFF;" |
| style="text-align:left;" | Laura Peddle
| style="text-align:right;" |Public Trustee, Ward 6
| style="text-align:right;" |Not Supportable
| style="background-color:#00FF00;" |
| style="background-color:#FFFFFF;" |
|-
| style="background-color:#FF7E00;" |
| style="text-align:left;" | Marlon Picken 
| style="text-align:right;" |Public Trustee, Ward 7
| style="text-align:right;" |Not Supportable
| style="background-color:#FFFFFF;" |
| style="background-color:#FF0000;" |
|-
| style="background-color:#FFA700;" |
| style="text-align:left;" | Wes Hicks
| style="text-align:right;" |Public Trustee, Ward 8
| style="text-align:right;" |Not Supportable
| style="background-color:#00FF00;" |
| style="background-color:#FFFFFF;" |
|-
| style="background-color:#FF7F00;" |
| style="text-align:left;" | Robert Barlow
| style="text-align:right;" |Public Trustee, Wards 9&10
| style="text-align:right;" |Not Supportable
| style="background-color:#00FF00;" |
| style="background-color:#FFFFFF;" |
|-
| style="background-color:#FF7F00;" |
| style="text-align:left;" | Jessica Brennan
| style="text-align:right;" |Public Trustee, Wards 13
| style="text-align:right;" |Not Supportable
| style="background-color:#00FF00;" |
| style="background-color:#FFFFFF;" |
|-
| style="background-color:#8A3324;" |
| style="text-align:left;" | Karen Turkstra
| style="text-align:right;" |Public Trustee, Wards 13
| style="text-align:right;" |Not Supportable
| style="background-color:#00FF00;" |
| style="background-color:#FFFFFF;" |
|- style="background-color:#pink"
| style="text-align:right;" colspan="3" | Total Not Supportable Public Trustee Candidates
| 10 || 8 || 2
|-
| style="background-color:#FF7E00;" |
| style="text-align:left;" | John Freiberger
| style="text-align:right;" |Catholic Trustee, Ward 8
| style="text-align:right;" |Not Supportable
| style="background-color:#FFFFFF;" |
| style="background-color:#FF0000;" |
|- style="background-color:#pink"
| style="text-align:right;" colspan="3" | Total Not Supportable Catholic Trustee Candidates
| 1 || 0 || 1
|- style="background-color:#E9E9E9;"
| style="text-align:right;" colspan="4" | Total Not Supportable Candidates
| 12 || 9 || 3
|- 
| style="text-align:left;" colspan="13" |Sources: Campaign Life Coalition. "Crucial moment for voter participation", Updated April, 2009. Accessed June 19, 2012.
|}

|-
!rowspan="2" colspan="3"|Candidate
!rowspan="2" colspan="1"|Seat Contested
!colspan="2"|Elected
|- 
! Yes
! No
|-
|rowspan="20" style="background-color:#FFE5B4" |
| style="background-color:#66023C;" |
| style="text-align:left;" | Fred Eisenberger
| style="text-align:right;" | Mayor
| style="background-color:#FFFFFF;" |
| style="background-color:#FF0000;" |
|- style="background-color:#FFE5B4;"
| style="text-align:right;" colspan="2" | Total Endorsed Mayoral Candidates
| 1 || 0 || 1
|-
| style="background-color:#FF7F00;" |
| style="text-align:left;" | Brian McHattie
| style="text-align:right;" |Councillor, Ward 1
| style="background-color:#00FF00;" |
| style="background-color:#FFFFFF;" |
|-
| style="background-color:#FF3800;" |
| style="text-align:left;" | Bob Black
| style="text-align:right;" |Councillor, Ward 3
| style="background-color:#FFFFFF;" |
| style="background-color:#FF0000;" |
|-
| style="background-color:#FF7F00;" |
| style="text-align:left;" | Sam Merula
| style="text-align:right;" |Councillor, Ward 4
| style="background-color:#00FF00;" |
| style="background-color:#FFFFFF;" |
|-
| style="background-color:#FFA700;" |
| style="text-align:left;" | Jaswinder Bedi
| style="text-align:right;" |Councillor, Ward 5
| style="background-color:#FFFFFF;" |
| style="background-color:#FF0000;" |
|-
| style="background-color:#FF7F00;" |
| style="text-align:left;" | Scott Duvall
| style="text-align:right;" |Councillor, Ward 7
| style="background-color:#00FF00;" |
| style="background-color:#FFFFFF;" |
|-
| style="background-color:#FF7F00;" |
| style="text-align:left;" | Bruce Whitelaw
| style="text-align:right;" |Councillor, Ward 8
| style="background-color:#FFFFFF;" |
| style="background-color:#FF0000;" |
|-
| style="background-color:#FF7F00;" |
| style="text-align:left;" | Gerladine McMullan
| style="text-align:right;" |Councillor, Ward 9
| style="background-color:#FFFFFF;" |
| style="background-color:#FF0000;" |
|-
| style="background-color:#66B032;" |
| style="text-align:left;" | Brenda Johnstone
| style="text-align:right;" |Councillor, Ward 11
| style="background-color:#00FF00;" |
| style="background-color:#FFFFFF;" |
|-
| style="background-color:#00A86B;" |
| style="text-align:left;" | Ron Trammer
| style="text-align:right;" |Councillor, Ward 13
| style="background-color:#FFFFFF;" |
| style="background-color:#FF0000;" |
|-
|- style="background-color:#FFE5B4;"
| style="text-align:right;" colspan="2" | Total Endorsed Council Candidates
| 9 || 4 || 5
|-
| style="background-color:#0892D0;" |
| style="text-align:left;" | Tim Simmons
| style="text-align:right;" |Public Trustee, Ward 3
| style="background-color:#00FF00;" |
| style="background-color:#FFFFFF;" |
|-
| style="background-color:#FFD12A;" |
| style="text-align:left;" | Jeannie Martel
| style="text-align:right;" |Public Trustee, Ward 6
| style="background-color:#FFFFFF;" |
| style="background-color:#FF0000;" |
|-
| style="background-color:#FF7E00;" |
| style="text-align:left;" | Marlon Picken 
| style="text-align:right;" |Public Trustee, Ward 7
| style="background-color:#FFFFFF;" |
| style="background-color:#FF0000;" |
|-
| style="background-color:#FFA700;" |
| style="text-align:left;" | Wes Hicks
| style="text-align:right;" |Public Trustee, Ward 8
| style="background-color:#00FF00;" |
| style="background-color:#FFFFFF;" |
|-
| style="background-color:#FF7F00;" |
| style="text-align:left;" | Robert Barlow
| style="text-align:right;" |Public Trustee, Wards 9&10
| style="background-color:#00FF00;" |
| style="background-color:#FFFFFF;" |
|-
| style="background-color:#FF7F00;" |
| style="text-align:left;" | Alex Johnstone
| style="text-align:right;" |Public Trustee, Wards 11&12
| style="background-color:#00FF00;" |
| style="background-color:#FFFFFF;" |
|-
| style="background-color:#FF7F00;" |
| style="text-align:left;" | Jessica Brennan
| style="text-align:right;" |Public Trustee, Wards 13
| style="background-color:#00FF00;" |
| style="background-color:#FFFFFF;" |
|-
|- style="background-color:#FFE5B4;"
| style="text-align:right;" colspan="2" | Total Endorsed Public Trustee Candidates
| 7 || 5 || 2
|-
|- style="background-color:#E9E9E9;"
| style="text-align:right;" colspan="3" | Total Endorsed Candidates
| 17 || 9 || 8
|- 
| style="text-align:left;" colspan="13" |Sources: "Labour council looks to change politicians", Hamilton Mountain News, October 14, 2010.
|}

Incumbents not seeking election
The only incumbent councillor to not seek re-election was Ward 15 representative Margaret McCarthy, who decided not to stand for re-election after serving on regional and Hamilton councils since 1994. She has cited family commitment as her reasoning for leaving politics after 16 years.

Wards 11 and 12 Public School Board Trustee Shirley Glauser announced she would not be seeking re-election following the completion of her first term in office. Glauser was the only public trustee to not seek another mandate in 2010.

Withdrawn candidates

Despite placing second in the 2006 Election and filing early in 2010 to run against Councillor Russ Powers in Ward 13, Julia Kollek withdrew her candidacy on June 3, 2010, stating that she wanted to help her community in ways other than as an elected representative. During an interview with the Dundas Star, she commented that "You can’t take the activist out of me!" 

Ward Three candidate and member of the Mohawk College faculty, Frank Bedek pulled out of the 5 person race on July 20, 2010.

Public School Board Trustee candidate for Ward 4, Ryan Sparrow, withdrew from that race in June. Sparrow had been a School Board candidate in Ward 3 during the 2006 Election, taking 17% of the vote, and was a candidate in the 2008 Federal Election for Hamilton Centre.

Timeline
November 13, 2006: 2006 Election
January 25, 2007: Shortly after the election, Councillor Morelli is accused of harassment, but council votes to stop proceedings.
April 11, 2007: After weeks of unruliness, Councillor Bratina throws a pen across the council chamber, leading Hamiltonians to believe that Mayor Eisenberger no longer has control of council 
November 28, 2007: Councillors are unaware of what they are voting on, as they vote to limit the number of garbage bags that will be collected during curbside pick ups to one.
February 5, 2008: Councillor Pasuta alleges Councillor Mitchell illegally lobbies him to support a land severance ruling on Mitchell's farm in Glanbrook. Mitchell denies any wrongdoing.
February 13, 2008: Council votes to censure Councillor Mitchell for the second time in three years. This means he will no longer be able to hold a committee chair or vice chair position for the rest of his term.
February 15, 2008: The Hamilton Spectator's editorial board calls for Councillor Mitchell to resign after the land-severance scandal. As of December 2008, he remains on council.
July 11, 2008: Former MP, Ian Deans, announces he is considering seeking election in any of the cities wards in the 2010 election if his Parkinson's has not incapacitated him
April 11, 2009: Sam Merulla, in a Hamilton Spectator article about his career, announces his intentions to run for re-election in Ward 4.
November 30, 2009: Councillor Ferguson becomes the first councillor to say he is considering a run against Fred Eisenberger for mayor.
January 1, 2010: Councillor Tom Jackson openly muses about running for mayor while fellow Mountain Councillors Scott Duvall and Terry Whitehead  announce their intent to seek re-election in Wards 7 and 8 respectively.
January 4, 2010: Jose Bustamante and Scott Duvall file their nomination papers to run for City Council in Wards 10 and 7 respectively, on the first day nominations open.
January 8, 2010: Michael Baldasaro becomes the first candidate to register in the Mayoral race.
May 18, 2010: Andrew Hines files to run for mayor.
May 31, 2010: Mayor Eisenberger files for re-election.
June 3, 2010: Julia Kollek, after filing to run in Ward 13 earlier in the year, withdraws her candidacy, leaving Councillor Russ Powers the only candidate in Dundas.
June 7, 2010: Glenn Hamilton files for the mayoral race, bringing the number of candidates to five.
June 22, 2010:  Ryan Sparrow, Public School Board Trustee candidate for Ward 4, withdraws from the race. Sparrow had been a School Board candidate in Ward 3 during the 2006 Election, taking 17% of the vote, and was a candidate in the 2008 Federal Election for Hamilton Centre.
July 20, 2010: Blogger Edward Graydon files to run for mayor, bringing the total number of candidates to six. Former mayor Larry DiIanni is widely speculated to announce his intention later in the week.
July 26, 2010: Former Mayor Larry Di Ianni announces his candidacy for the position of Mayor. In an interview with the Spectator, he said that he "has learned some political lessons, but also has seen the community, and the importance of council, from a different perspective."
July 30, 2010: Joke candidate from 2006, Marty Zulinack, files to run for mayor. Eight candidates now vie for the seat.
August 10, 2010: Earl Basse, the city's Integrity Commissioner, clears Ward 8 councillor Terry Whitehead of all harassment allegations brought against him by a former employee. In response to the investigation, Basse provided recommendations for the hiring of administrative assistants that included "developing minimum standards of education and experience for executive assistants; that an orientation package be provided for new assistants; and that a management training program for new councillors be included in their training." Later in the day, after a marathon council session, City Council votes 12 - 3 in favour of the West Harbour location for the city's Pan Am Games stadium.
August 18, 2010: Local lawyer Pasquale Filice is the ninth local resident to file for the mayor's race. With just over two weeks before the end of nominations, 6 sitting councillors, 6 sitting Public School Board trustees and 5 Catholic School Board trustees remain without challengers.
August 25, 2010: Farmer Victor Veri becomes the tenth candidate for Mayor as Councillor Bernie Morelli files for his seventh election since 1991.
September 2, 2010: Former New Democratic MP and MPP Ian Deans files to run for mayor among a host of others, who collectively bring the total number of candidates to 13.
September 3, 2010: Downtown councillor Bob Bratina announces his intention to stand for mayor on his morning radio show, saying that he will have officially filed and left his job at CHML by the September 10.
September 10, 2010: Nominations close
October 25, 2010: Election day

See also
List of Hamilton, Ontario municipal elections

References

External links
 City of Hamilton official Municipal Elections webpage

2010 Ontario municipal elections
2010